= Edward J. Lofgren =

American physicist

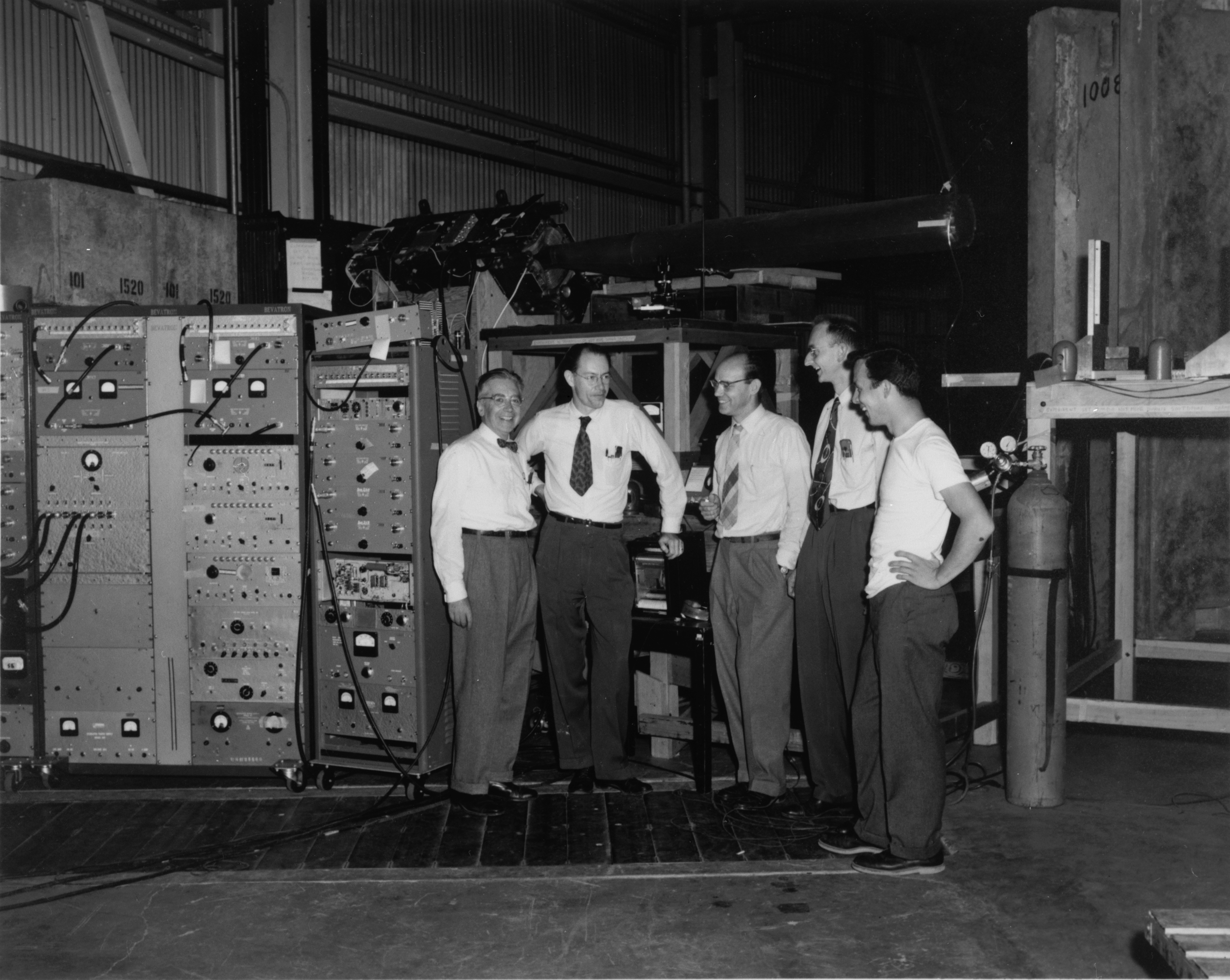
BEV-938. Antiproton set-up with work group: Emilio Segre, Clyde Wiegand, Edward J. Lofgren, Owen Chamberlain, Thomas Ypsilantis, 1955

Edward Joseph Lofgren (January 18, 1914 – September 6, 2016) was an American physicist with Swedish heritage (Löfgren, meaning "Leaf-branch" in Swedish) in the early days of nuclear physics and elementary particle research at the Lawrence Berkeley Laboratory (LBL). He was born in Chicago. He was an important figure in the breakthroughs that followed the creation of the Bevatron, of which he was the director for a time.

Lofgren graduated from UC Berkeley in May 1938, and got a summer job working on E. O. Lawrence's new 37-inch cyclotron completed in 1937, at a salary of about $0.50 an hour. At that time there was no government funding for scientific research, and the money came from medical foundations interested in evaluating the possible uses of neutron beams for cancer treatment and for producing radio-isotopes for medical research.

In the fall of 1940 he was hired by Lawrence to help on adapting and using the 37-inch cyclotron to separate isotopes of uranium for the atomic bomb project. Later, he went to Los Alamos, where the first bombs were designed and built, and where he remained for the rest of the war. With the end of the war he returned to Berkeley to complete the final year of his degree program, then went on to the University of Minnesota as a post doctoral fellow. He then returned to the laboratory at Berkeley and remained at the Laboratory until his retirement in 1982. He turned 100 in January 2014 and died on September 6, 2016, at the age of 102.

Not until after both men's passings, it was established that Lofgren was a 7th cousin to chemist and 1951 Nobel prize laureate Glenn T. Seaborg, also at Berkeley, who was a principal or co-discoverer of ten of the transuranium elements, and developed the actinide concept and the arrangement of the actinide series in the periodic table of the elements.
