= Oreste Piccioni =

Italian-American physicist (1915–2002)

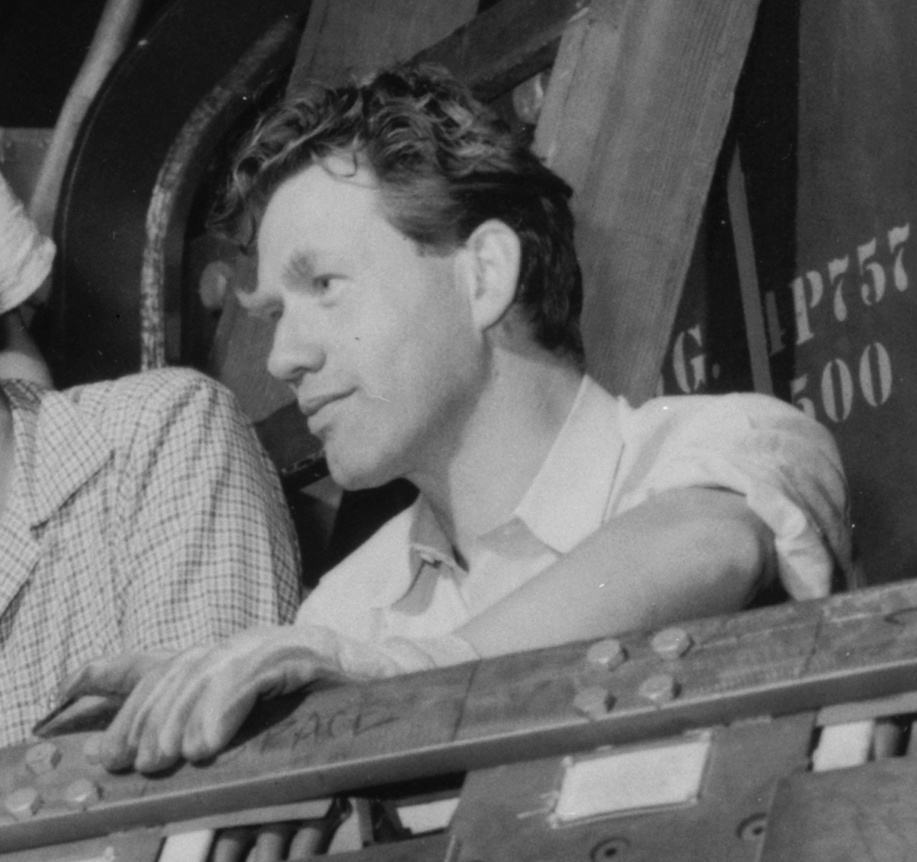
- Photo 1956
- Born: 24 October 1915; Siena, Kingdom of Italy
- Died: 13 April 2002 (aged 86); Rancho Santa Fe, California, U.S.
- Education: Sapienza University of Rome
- Awards: Matteucci Medal (1999)
- Scientific career
- Workplaces: MIT; Brookhaven National Laboratory; University of California, Berkeley; University of California, San Diego
- Doctoral advisor: Enrico Fermi

Oreste Piccioni (24 October 1915 – 13 April 2002) was an Italian-American physicist who made important contributions to elementary particle physics. He is the co-discoverer of the antineutron.

== Biography ==
Piccioni was born in Siena in 1915 to Ubaldo Piccioni and Calliope Burali, both originally from Grosseto. His father was killed during World War I, and he was raised in Grosseto by his mother, a seamstress, together with his older sister Anna. He attended the Carducci-Ricasoli Classical High School before enrolling in the Faculty of Physics at the University of Pisa in 1934. Admitted to the prestigious Scuola Normale Superiore, he later transferred to the University of Rome, where he studied under Enrico Fermi. On 4 July 1938, Piccioni graduated with a thesis in electronics titled Stabilized Voltage Power Supply under Fermi's supervision.

In 1939, he was appointed assistant lecturer in advanced physics at the Institute of Physics in Rome. During World War II, he did fundamental research under difficult conditions in the basement of a high school, which first clarified the nature of the muon.

In March 1945, Piccioni married Mirella Monti, a fellow native of Grosseto. Their first son, Roberto, was born in May 1946. That year, he emigrated with his family to the United States, where he worked first at the Massachusetts Institute of Technology with Bruno Rossi, and then at Brookhaven National Laboratory's Cosmotron, developing faster nuclear electronics and essential techniques for extracting, transporting, and focusing beams of high energy particles. Later at UC Berkeley's Lawrence Radiation laboratory he was a co-discoverer of the antineutron in 1956 at the Bevatron.

His important contributions to the design of the experiment that discovered the antiproton in 1955 were acknowledged in the 1959 ceremony in which the Nobel Prize in Physics was awarded to Emilio Segrè and Owen Chamberlain. Unfortunately a famous quarrel over credit and priority for the discovery embittered Piccioni for much of his later life, to the point that he filed a lawsuit in 1972 against Segrè and Chamberlain, seeking damages and public acknowledgment of his contributions. The suit was ultimately dismissed as filed too late for consideration of the issues.

An important theoretical paper with Abraham Pais in 1955 considered regeneration in neutral kaon mixing. In 1960 he joined the faculty of the University of California, San Diego (UCSD), where his group made the first measurement of the neutral kaon K_{1}-K_{2} mass difference.

Piccioni retired from UCSD as Professor Emeritus in 1986, but continued to give review talks and work in the investigation of fundamental problems in quantum mechanics.

== Awards and honors ==
In 1999 he was awarded the Matteucci Medal by the Accademia Nazionale delle Scienze (National Academy of Sciences) in Italy.

== Selected publications ==
- On the Disintegration of Negative Mesons. With M. Conversi and E. Pancini. Phys. Rev. 71, 209 (1947).
- External Proton Beam of the Cosmotron. With D. Clark et al. Rev. of Scien. Instruments 26, 232 (1955).
- Note on the Decay and Absorption of the Theta-zero. With A. Pais. Phys. Rev. 100, 1487 (1955).
- Antineutrons Produced from Antiprotons in Charge Exchange Collisions. With B. Cork et al. Phys. Rev. 104, 1193 (1956).
- Regeneration of Neutral K Mesons and their Mass Difference. With R. Good et al. Phys. Rev. 124, 1223 (1961).
- Is the Einstein-Podolsky-Rosen Paradox Demanded by Quantum Mechanics? With P. Bowles et al. In Open Questions in Quantum Physics. Ed. G. Tarozzi and A. van der Merwe. D. Reidel Publishing Co., Holland 103-118 (1984).
- A Discussion of the EPR Contained in QM Terms without Arguments of Politics or Bell's Relations. With W. Mehlhop. In Proc. of Symposium "New Techniques and Ideas in Quantum Measurement Theory", New York, Annals of New York Academy of Sciences 480, 458 (1987).
- Bell's Theorem and the Foundation of Modern Physics. Ed. A. van der Mezne and F. Selleri. World Scientific Publishing Co., Cesena, Italy, October 1991.
