= Pbar =

pbar may refer to:

- picobar, a unit of pressure
- antiproton, a fundamental particle, its symbol is $\bar{p}$, "p-bar"
