= Annihilation radiation =

Radiation resulting from particle-antiparticle collisions

Annihilation radiation is a term used in gamma spectroscopy for the photon radiation produced when a particle and its antiparticle collide and annihilate. Most commonly, this refers to 511-keV photons produced by an electron interacting with a positron. These photons are frequently referred to as gamma rays, despite having their origin outside the nucleus, due to unclear distinctions between types of photon radiation. The positively-charged antiparticle of the electron (known as the positron) is emitted from the nucleus as it undergoes β+ decay. The positron travels a short distance (a few millimeters), depositing any excess energy before it combines with a free electron. The mass of the e- and e+ is completely converted into two photons with an energy of 511 keV each. These annihilation photons are emitted in opposite directions, 180˚ apart. This is the basis for PET scanners in a process called coincidence counting.

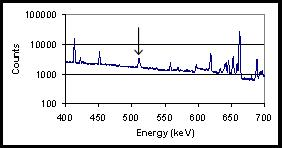
A Germanium detector spectrum showing the annihilation radiation peak (under the arrow). Note the width of the peak compared to the gamma ray peaks from radioactive decay visible in the spectrum.

Annihilation radiation is not monoenergetic, unlike gamma rays produced by radioactive decay. The production mechanism of annihilation radiation introduces Doppler broadening. The annihilation peak produced in a photon spectrum by annihilation radiation therefore has a higher full width at half maximum (FWHM) than decay-generated gamma rays in spectrum. The difference is more apparent with high resolution detectors, such as Germanium detectors, than with low resolution detectors such as Sodium iodide detectors.

Because of their well-defined energy (510.99895069(16) keV) and characteristic, Doppler-broadened shape, annihilation radiation can often be useful in defining the energy calibration of a gamma ray spectrum.
