= Bevatron =

Particle accelerator at Lawrence Berkeley National Laboratory

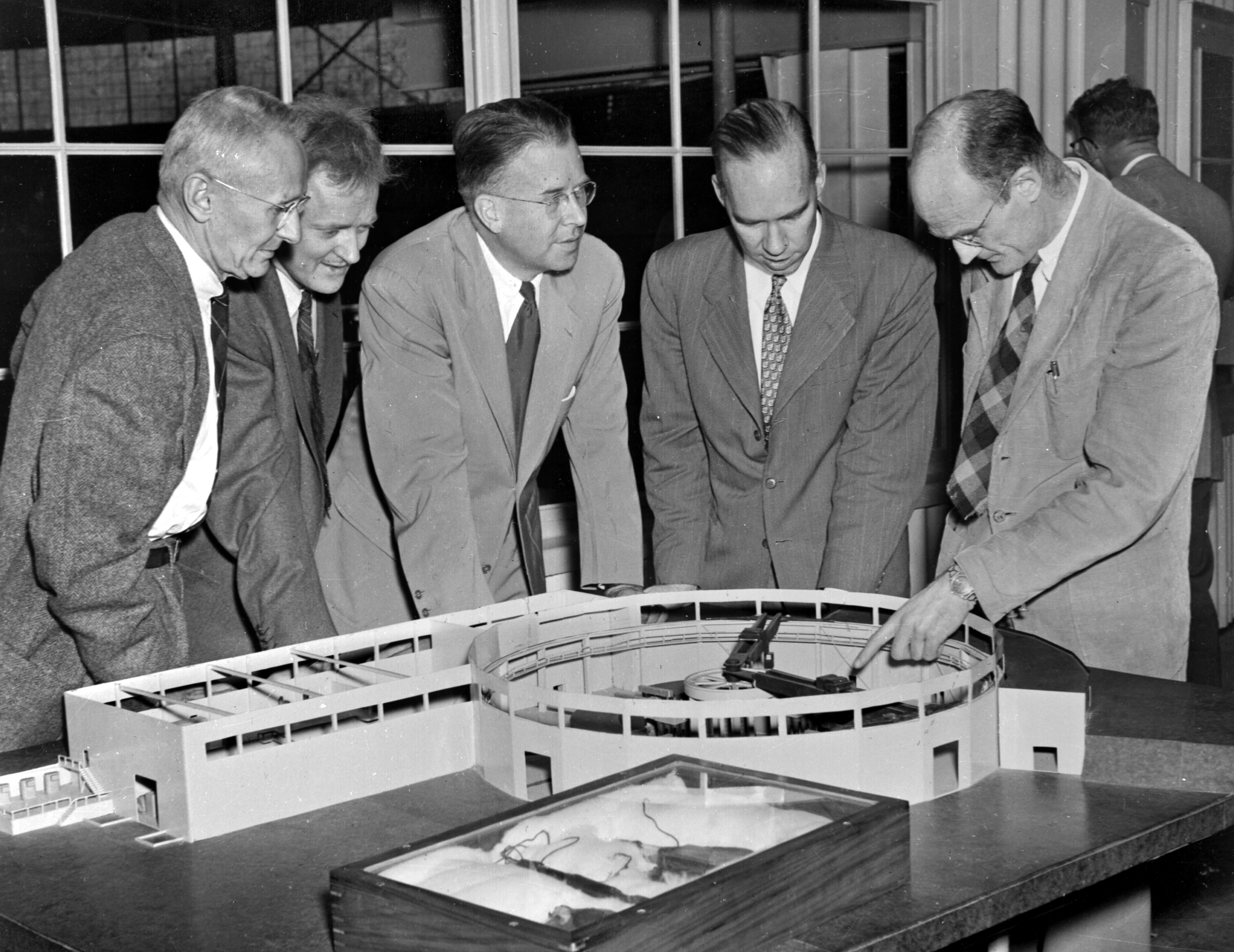
- Donald Cooksey, Harold Fidler, Ernest Lawrence, William Brobeck, and Robert Thornton overlooking model of Bevatron, 1950

General properties
- Accelerator type: Synchrotron
- Beam type: proton
- Target type: fixed target

Beam properties
- Maximum energy: 13 GeV

Physical properties
- Circumference: 400 ft
- Location: Berkeley, California
- Coordinates: 37.877392°N 122.250811°W
- Institution: Lawrence Berkeley National Laboratory
- Dates of operation: 1954 - 1993

The Bevatron (/ˈbɛvətrɒn/ BEV-ə-tron) was a particle accelerator – specifically, a weak-focusing proton synchrotron – located at Lawrence Berkeley National Laboratory, U.S., which began operations in 1954. The antiproton was discovered there in 1955, resulting in the 1959 Nobel Prize in physics for Emilio Segrè and Owen Chamberlain. It accelerated protons into a fixed target, and was named for its ability to impart energies of billions of eV ("billions of eV synchrotron").

== Antiprotons ==
When the Bevatron was designed, scientists strongly suspected—but had not yet confirmed—that every particle had a corresponding antiparticle with an opposite charge but otherwise identical properties, a concept known as charge symmetry.

The anti-electron, or positron, had been first observed in the early 1930s and theoretically understood as a consequence of the Dirac equation at about the same time. Following World War II, positive and negative muons and pions were observed in cosmic-ray interactions seen in cloud chambers and stacks of nuclear photographic emulsions. The Bevatron was built to be energetic enough to create antiprotons, and thus test the hypothesis that every particle has a corresponding anti-particle. In 1955, the antiproton was discovered using the Bevatron. The antineutron was discovered soon thereafter by the team of Bruce Cork, Glen Lambertson, Oreste Piccioni, and William Wenzel in 1956. Confirmation of the charge symmetry conjecture in 1955 led to the Nobel Prize for physics being awarded to Emilio Segrè and Owen Chamberlain in 1959.

Shortly after the Bevatron came into use, it was recognized that parity was not conserved in the weak interactions, which led to resolution of the tau-theta puzzle, the understanding of strangeness, and the establishment of CPT symmetry as a basic feature of relativistic quantum field theories.

== Requirements and design ==
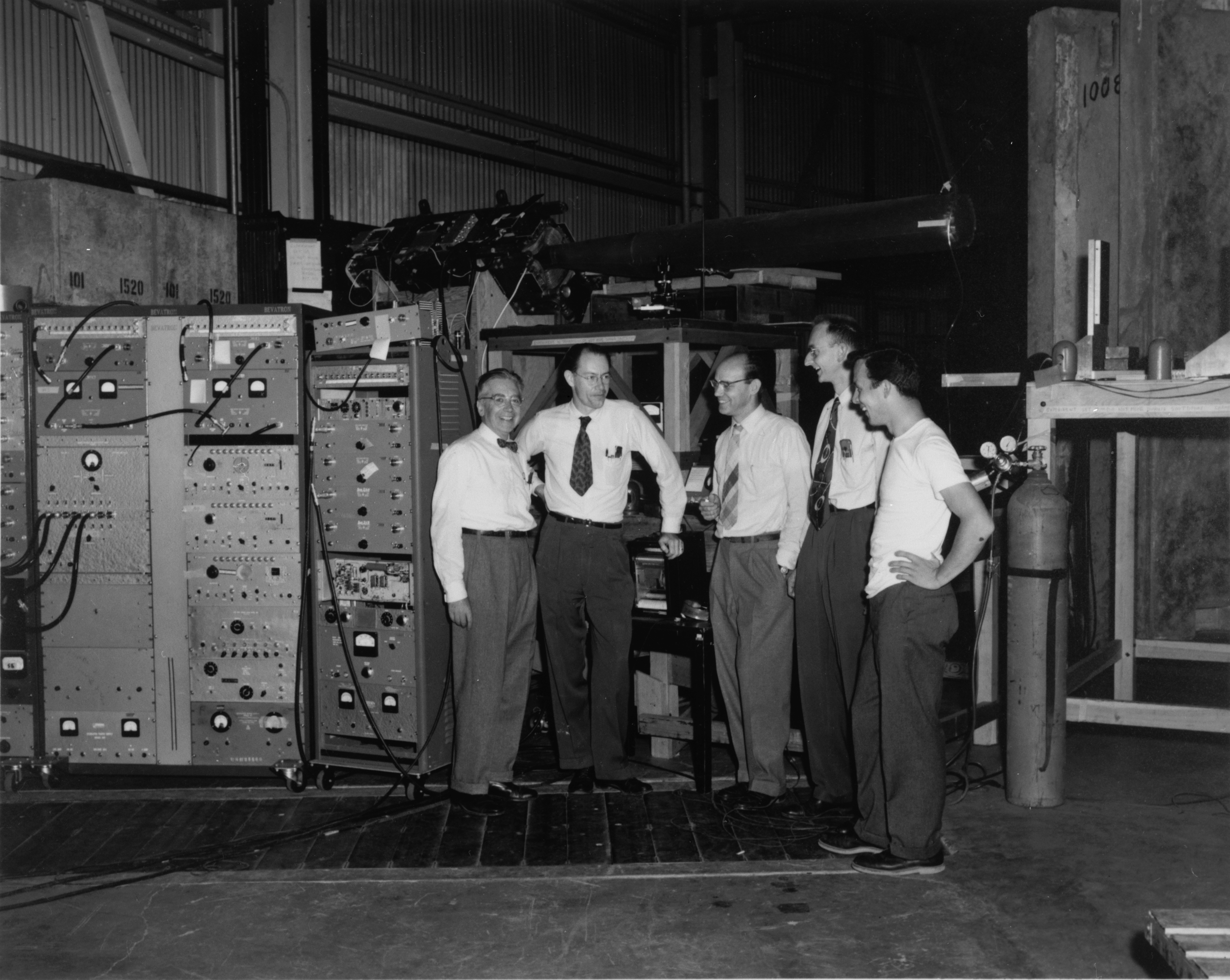
BEV-938. Antiproton set-up with work group: Emilio Segre, Clyde Wiegand, Edward J. Lofgren, Owen Chamberlain, Thomas Ypsilantis, 1955

In order to create antiprotons (mass ~938 MeV/c^{2}) in collisions with nucleons in a stationary target while conserving both energy and momentum, a proton beam energy of approximately 6.2 GeV is required. At the time it was built, there was no known way to confine a particle beam to a narrow aperture, so the beam space was about four square feet in cross section. The combination of beam aperture and energy required a huge, 10,000 ton iron magnet, and a very large vacuum system.

A large motor–generator system was used to ramp up the magnetic field for each cycle of acceleration. At the end of each cycle, after the beam was used or extracted, the large magnetic field energy was returned to spin up the motor, which was then used as a generator to power the next cycle, conserving energy; the entire process required about five seconds. The characteristic rising and falling, wailing, sound of the motor–generator system could be heard in the entire complex when the machine was in operation.

In the years following the antiproton discovery, much pioneering work was done here using beams of protons extracted from the accelerator proper, to hit targets and generate secondary beams of elementary particles, not only protons but also neutrons, pions, "strange particles", and many others.

== The liquid-hydrogen bubble chamber ==
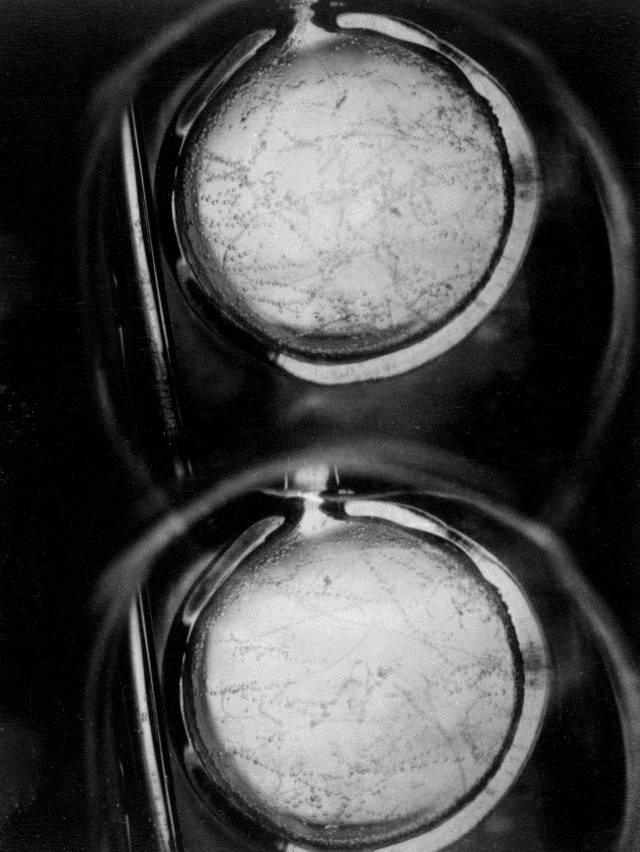
First tracks observed in liquid hydrogen bubble chamber at the Bevatron

The extracted particle beams, both the primary protons and secondaries, could in turn be passed for further study through various targets and specialized detectors, notably the liquid hydrogen bubble chamber. Many thousands of particle interactions, or "events", were photographed, measured, and studied in detail with an automated system of large measuring machines (known as "Franckensteins", for their inventor Jack Franck).

This process allowed human operators to manually mark points along particle tracks and enter their coordinates onto IBM punch cards using a foot pedal. These card decks were then processed by early-generation computers, which reconstructed the three-dimensional trajectories through magnetic fields and calculated the particles’ momenta and energies. At the time, highly sophisticated computer programs were used to fit the track data for each event, enabling estimates of the particles’ energies, masses, and identities.

This period, when hundreds of new particles and excited states were suddenly revealed, marked the beginning of a new era in elementary particle physics. Luis Alvarez inspired and directed much of this work, for which he received the Nobel Prize in physics in 1968.

== Bevalac ==
The Bevatron received a new lease on life in 1971, when it was joined to the SuperHILAC linear accelerator as an injector for heavy ions. The combination was conceived by Albert Ghiorso, who named it the Bevalac. It could accelerate a wide range of stable nuclei to relativistic energies. It was finally decommissioned in 1993.

== End of life ==
The next generation of accelerators adopted "strong focusing," which allowed for much smaller beam apertures and, consequently, significantly cheaper magnets. The CERN PS (Proton Synchrotron, 1959) and the Brookhaven National Laboratory AGS (Alternating Gradient Synchrotron, 1960) were the first next-generation machines, with an aperture roughly an order of magnitude less in both transverse directions, and reaching 30 GeV proton energy, yet with a less massive magnet ring. For comparison, the circulating beams in the Large Hadron Collider (LHC) reach energies nearly 11,000 times greater than those in the Bevatron, with vastly higher intensities. Despite this, they are confined to a cross-sectional area of about 1 mm and are focused to just 16 micrometres at collision points, while the bending magnet fields are only about five times stronger.

The demolition of the Bevatron began in 2009 and was completed in early 2012.

== See also ==
- Alternating Gradient Synchrotron: 33 GeV strong-focusing synchrotron, next step after Bevatron
- Tevatron: Fermi Lab accelerator, 1 TeV proton-antiproton collider, largest particle accelerator built in the US (ceased operations in 2011)
