= Recycling antimatter =

Recycling antimatter pertains to recycling antiprotons and antihydrogen atoms.
