= Antineutron =

Subatomic particle

- The quark structure of the antineutron.
- Classification: antibaryon
- Composition: 1 up antiquark, 2 down antiquarks
- Statistics: fermionic
- Family: hadron
- Interactions: strong, weak, electromagnetic, gravitational
- Symbol: n̅
- Antiparticle: neutron
- Discovered: Bruce Cork (1956)
- Mass: 939.56542194(48) MeV/c^{2}
- Mean lifetime: 878.4(5) s (free)
- Electric charge: 0 e
- Magnetic moment: +1.91 μ_{N}
- Spin: 1/2 ħ
- Isospin: 1/2

The antineutron is the antiparticle of the neutron with symbol n̅. It differs from the neutron only in that some of its properties have equal magnitude but opposite sign. It has the same mass as the neutron, and no net electric charge, but has opposite baryon number (+1 for neutron, −1 for the antineutron). This is because the antineutron is composed of antiquarks, while neutrons are composed of quarks. The antineutron consists of one up antiquark and two down antiquarks.

== Background ==
The antineutron was discovered in proton–antiproton collisions at the Bevatron (Lawrence Berkeley National Laboratory) by the team of Bruce Cork, Glen Lambertson, Oreste Piccioni, and William Wenzel in 1956, one year after the antiproton was discovered.

Since the antineutron is electrically neutral, it cannot easily be observed directly. Instead, the products of its annihilation with ordinary matter are observed. In theory, a free antineutron should decay into an antiproton, a positron, and a neutrino in a process analogous to the beta decay of free neutrons. There are theoretical proposals of neutron–antineutron oscillations, a process that implies the violation of the baryon number conservation. There is a project to search for neutron-antineutron oscillations using ultracold neutrons.

== Magnetic moment ==
The magnetic moment of the antineutron is the opposite of that of the neutron. It is +1.91 μ_{N} for the antineutron but −1.91 μ_{N} for the neutron (relative to the direction of the spin). Here μ_{N} is the nuclear magneton.

== See also ==
- Antimatter
- Neutron magnetic moment
- List of particles
