= S. N. Ghoshal =

Indian nuclear physicist and educator

- Born: Samarendra Nath Ghoshal; 1923; Kolkata, India
- Died: 2007 (age 84)
- Education: University of Calcutta (MSc); University of California, Berkeley (PhD)
- Scientific career
- Fields: Nuclear physics
- Workplaces: Lucknow University; Saha Institute of Nuclear Physics; Presidency College, Calcutta; University of Calcutta
- Doctoral advisor: Emilio Segrè

Samarendra Nath Ghoshal (1923 – 2007) was an Indian nuclear physicist and educator. He did some research in this area, particularly early in his career, but spent most of his life in various educational roles in Kolkata and Lucknow, India.

== Personal life and education ==
Ghoshal was born in Kolkata in 1923.

Ghoshal completed his Master of Science degree at the University of Calcutta. He earned his doctoral degree at the University of California, Berkeley under the supervision of Emilio Segrè, where he focused on the young field of experimental nuclear physics. In a 1950 paper published in Physical Review, Ghoshal provided experimental support for Niels Bohr's theoretical model of the formation of compound nuclei. Though this was during the time of his doctoral studies, he planned and completed this experiment and paper while Segrè was away.

Ghoshal became bedridden due to a stroke and died in 2007.

== Career ==
During his career, Ghoshal taught at Lucknow University, the Saha Institute of Nuclear Physics, Presidency College, Calcutta, and the University of Calcutta (where he served as Khaira Professor of Physics). Roles in administration included being principal at Presidency College, Calcutta and Director of Public Instruction in West Bengal.

Ghoshal also authored physics textbooks that became widely used in Indian universities, including Atomic Physics and Nuclear Physics.

== Publications ==
- Ghoshal, S. N. (1950). "An Experimental Verification of the Theory of Compound Nucleus". Physical Review. 80 (6): 939–942. doi:10.1103/PhysRev.80.939.
- Ghoshal, S. N. (1953). "Letters to the editor: Beta activity of In^{109}". Current Science. 22 (10). Current Science Association: 296–298. ISSN 0011-3891. JSTOR 24053050.
- Ghoshal, S. N.; Baliga, B. B. (1957). "On the Elastic Scattering of Charged Particles by Nuclei in the Intermediate Energy Region". Progress of Theoretical Physics. 17 (4): 556–560. doi:10.1143/PTP.17.556. ISSN 0033-068X.
