= Antiparticle =

Particle with opposite charges

Illustration of electric charge of particles (left) and antiparticles (right). From top to bottom; electron/positron, proton/antiproton, neutron/antineutron.

In particle physics, every type of particle of "ordinary" matter (as opposed to antimatter) is associated with an antiparticle with the same mass but with opposite physical charges (such as electric charge). For example, the antiparticle of the electron is the positron (also known as an antielectron). While the electron has a negative electric charge, the positron has a positive electric charge, and is produced naturally in certain types of radioactive decay. The opposite is also true: the antiparticle of the positron is the electron.

Some particles, such as the photon, are their own antiparticle. Otherwise, for each pair of antiparticle partners, one is designated as the normal particle (the one that occurs in matter usually interacted with in daily life). The other (usually given the prefix "anti-") is designated the antiparticle.

Particle–antiparticle pairs can annihilate each other, producing photons; since the charges of the particle and antiparticle are opposite, total charge is conserved. For example, the positrons produced in natural radioactive decay quickly annihilate themselves with electrons, producing pairs of gamma rays, a process exploited in positron emission tomography.

The laws of nature are very nearly symmetrical with respect to particles and antiparticles. For example, an antiproton and a positron can form an antihydrogen atom, which is believed to have the same properties as a hydrogen atom. This leads to the question of why the formation of matter after the Big Bang resulted in a universe consisting almost entirely of matter, rather than being a half-and-half mixture of matter and antimatter. The discovery of charge parity violation helped to shed light on this problem by showing that this symmetry, originally thought to be perfect, was only approximate. Still, the question remains an unanswered one, and explanations so far are not truly satisfactory, overall.

Because charge is conserved, it is not possible to create an antiparticle without either destroying another particle of the same charge (as is for instance the case when antiparticles are produced naturally via beta decay or the collision of cosmic rays with Earth's atmosphere), or by the simultaneous creation of both a particle and its antiparticle (pair production), which can occur in particle accelerators such as the Large Hadron Collider at CERN.

Particles and their antiparticles have equal and opposite charges, so that an uncharged particle also gives rise to an uncharged antiparticle. In many cases, the antiparticle and the particle coincide: pairs of photons, Z^{0} bosons, π^{0} mesons, and hypothetical gravitons and some hypothetical WIMPs all self-annihilate. However, electrically neutral particles need not be identical to their antiparticles: for example, the neutron and antineutron are distinct.

== History ==
=== Experiment ===
In 1932, soon after the prediction of positrons by Paul Dirac, Carl D. Anderson found that cosmic-ray collisions produced these particles in a cloud chamber – a particle detector in which moving electrons (or positrons) leave behind trails as they move through the gas. The electric charge-to-mass ratio of a particle can be measured by observing the radius of curling of its cloud-chamber track in a magnetic field. Positrons, because of the direction that their paths curled, were at first mistaken for electrons travelling in the opposite direction. Positron paths in a cloud-chamber trace the same helical path as an electron but rotate in the opposite direction with respect to the magnetic field direction due to their having the same magnitude of charge-to-mass ratio but with opposite charge and, therefore, opposite signed charge-to-mass ratios.

The antiproton and antineutron were found by Emilio Segrè and Owen Chamberlain in 1955 at the University of California, Berkeley. Since then, the antiparticles of many other subatomic particles have been created in particle accelerator experiments. In recent years, complete atoms of antimatter have been assembled out of antiprotons and positrons, collected in electromagnetic traps.

=== Dirac hole theory ===
... the development of quantum field theory made the interpretation of antiparticles as holes unnecessary, even though it lingers on in many textbooks.

— Steven Weinberg

Solutions of the Dirac equation contain negative energy quantum states. As a result, an electron could always radiate energy and fall into a negative energy state. Even worse, it could keep radiating infinite amounts of energy because there were infinitely many negative energy states available. To prevent this unphysical situation from happening, Dirac proposed that a "sea" of negative-energy electrons fills the universe, already occupying all of the lower-energy states so that, due to the Pauli exclusion principle, no other electron could fall into them. Sometimes, however, one of these negative-energy particles could be lifted out of this Dirac sea to become a positive-energy particle. But, when lifted out, it would leave behind a hole in the sea that would act exactly like a positive-energy electron with a reversed charge. These holes were interpreted as "negative-energy electrons" by Paul Dirac and mistakenly identified with protons in his 1930 paper A Theory of Electrons and Protons However, these "negative-energy electrons" turned out to be positrons, and not protons.

This picture implied an infinite negative charge for the universe – a problem of which Dirac was aware. Dirac tried to argue that we would perceive this as the normal state of zero charge. Another difficulty was the difference in masses of the electron and the proton. Dirac tried to argue that this was due to the electromagnetic interactions with the sea, until Hermann Weyl proved that hole theory was completely symmetric between negative and positive charges. Dirac also predicted a reaction e^{−} + p^{+} → γ + γ, where an electron and a proton annihilate to give two photons. Robert Oppenheimer and Igor Tamm, however, proved that this would cause ordinary matter to disappear too fast. A year later, in 1931, Dirac modified his theory and postulated the positron, a new particle of the same mass as the electron. The discovery of this particle the next year removed the last two objections to his theory.

Within Dirac's theory, the problem of infinite charge of the universe remains. Some bosons also have antiparticles, but since bosons do not obey the Pauli exclusion principle (only fermions do), hole theory does not work for them. A unified interpretation of antiparticles is now available in quantum field theory, which solves both these problems by describing antimatter as negative energy states of the same underlying matter field, i.e. particles moving backwards in time.

== Conservation of baryon number ==
In 1938 Ernst Stueckelberg proposed conservation of baryon number as a law governing elementary particle reactions. All baryons, like protons and neutrons, are assigned baryon number +1 while their antiparticle counterparts are assigned -1. For example, the decay of the neutron,
$$n \rightarrow p^+ + e^- + \bar{\nu}_e$$
conserves baryon number because the neutron on the left side and the proton on the right side both have baryon number +1 while other particles are not baryons. Since protons are the lowest energy baryon, no decay reaction can yield another baryon: the conservation law predicts the observed stability of the proton.

== Elementary antiparticles ==
Antiquarks
Generation	Name	Symbol	Spin	Charge (e)	Mass (MeV/c^{2})	Observed
1	up antiquark	u̅	1/2	−2/3	2.2+0.6 −0.4	Yes
1	down antiquark	d̅	1/2	+1/3	4.6+0.5 −0.4	Yes
2	charm antiquark	c̅	1/2	−2/3	1280±30	Yes
2	strange antiquark	s̅	1/2	+1/3	96+8 −4	Yes
3	top antiquark	t̅	1/2	−2/3	173100±600	Yes
3	bottom antiquark	b̅	1/2	+1/3	4180+40 −30	Yes

Antileptons
Generation	Name	Symbol	Spin	Charge (e)	Mass (MeV/c^{2})	Observed
1	positron	e^{+}	1 /2	+1	0.511	Yes
1	electron antineutrino	ν̅_{e}	1 /2	0	< 0.0000022	Yes
2	antimuon	μ^{+}	1 /2	+1	105.7	Yes
2	muon antineutrino	ν̅_{μ}	1 /2	0	< 0.170	Yes
3	antitau	τ^{+}	1 /2	+1	1776.86±0.12	Yes
3	tau antineutrino	ν̅_{τ}	1 /2	0	< 15.5	Yes

Antibosons
Name	Symbol	Spin	Charge (e)	Mass (GeV/c^{2})	Interaction mediated	Observed
anti W boson	W^{+}	1	+1	80.385±0.015	weak interaction	Yes

== Composite antiparticles ==
Class	Subclass	Name	Symbol	Spin	Charge (e)	Mass (MeV/c^{2})	Mass (kg)	Observed
Antihadron	Antibaryon	Antiproton	p̅	1 /2	−1	938.27208943(29)	1.67262192595(52)×10^{−27}	Yes
Antihadron	Antibaryon	Antineutron	n̅	1 /2	0	939.56542194(48)	?	Yes

== Particle–antiparticle annihilation ==
An example of a virtual pion pair that influences the propagation of a kaon, causing a neutral kaon to mix with the antikaon. This is an example of renormalization in quantum field theory – the field theory being necessary because of the change in particle number.

If a particle and antiparticle are in the appropriate quantum states, then they can annihilate each other and produce other particles. Reactions such as e^{−} + e^{+} → γγ (the two-photon annihilation of an electron-positron pair) are an example. The single-photon annihilation of an electron-positron pair, e^{−} + e^{+} → γ, cannot occur in free space because it is impossible to conserve energy and momentum together in this process. However, in the Coulomb field of a nucleus the translational invariance is broken and single-photon annihilation may occur. The reverse reaction (in free space, without an atomic nucleus) is also impossible for this reason. In quantum field theory, this process is allowed only as an intermediate quantum state for times short enough that the violation of energy conservation can be accommodated by the uncertainty principle. This opens the way for virtual pair production or annihilation in which a one particle quantum state may fluctuate into a two particle state and back. These processes are important in the vacuum state and renormalization of a quantum field theory. It also opens the way for neutral particle mixing through processes such as the one pictured here, which is a complicated example of mass renormalization.

== Properties ==
Quantum states of a particle and an antiparticle are interchanged by the combined application of charge conjugation $C$, parity $P$ and time reversal $T$. $C$ and $P$ are linear, unitary operators, $T$ is antilinear and antiunitary, $\langle \Psi | T\,\Phi\rangle = \langle \Phi | T^{-1}\,\Psi\rangle$. If $|p,\sigma ,n \rangle$ denotes the quantum state of a particle $n$ with momentum $p$ and spin $J$ whose component in the z-direction is $\sigma$, then one has

$$CPT \ |p,\sigma,n \rangle\ =\ (-1)^{J-\sigma}\ |p,-\sigma,n^c \rangle ,$$

where $n^c$ denotes the charge conjugate state, that is, the antiparticle. In particular a massive particle and its antiparticle transform under the same irreducible representation of the Poincaré group which means the antiparticle has the same mass and the same spin.

If $C$, $P$ and $T$ can be defined separately on the particles and antiparticles, then

$$T\ |p,\sigma,n\rangle \ \propto \ |-p,-\sigma,n\rangle ,$$
$$CP\ |p,\sigma,n\rangle \ \propto \ |-p,\sigma,n^c\rangle ,$$
$$C\ |p,\sigma,n\rangle \ \propto \ |p,\sigma,n^c\rangle ,$$

where the proportionality sign indicates that there might be a phase on the right hand side.

As $CPT$ anticommutes with the charges, $CPT\,Q = - Q\, CPT$, particle and antiparticle have opposite electric charges q and -q.

== Quantum field theory ==
This section draws upon the ideas, language and notation of canonical quantization of a quantum field theory.

One may try to quantize an electron field without mixing the annihilation and creation operators by writing

$$\psi (x)=\sum_{k}u_k (x)a_k e^{-iE(k)t},\,$$

where we use the symbol k to denote the quantum numbers p and σ of the previous section and the sign of the energy, E(k), and a_{k} denotes the corresponding annihilation operators. Of course, since we are dealing with fermions, we have to have the operators satisfy canonical anti-commutation relations. However, if one now writes down the Hamiltonian

$$H=\sum_{k} E(k) a^\dagger_k a_k,\,$$

then one sees immediately that the expectation value of H need not be positive. This is because E(k) can have any sign whatsoever, and the combination of creation and annihilation operators has expectation value 1 or 0.

So one has to introduce the charge conjugate antiparticle field, with its own creation and annihilation operators satisfying the relations

$$b_{k\prime} = a^\dagger_k\ \mathrm{and}\ b^\dagger_{k\prime}=a_k,\,$$

where k has the same p, and opposite σ and sign of the energy. Then one can rewrite the field in the form

$$\psi(x)=\sum_{k_+} u_k (x)a_k e^{-iE(k)t}+\sum_{k_-} u_k (x)b^\dagger _k e^{-iE(k)t},\,$$

where the first sum is over positive energy states and the second over those of negative energy. The energy becomes

$$H=\sum_{k_+} E_k a^\dagger _k a_k + \sum_{k_-} |E(k)|b^\dagger_k b_k + E_0,\,$$

where E_{0} is an infinite negative constant. The vacuum state is defined as the state with no particle or antiparticle, i.e., $a_k |0\rangle=0$ and $b_k |0\rangle=0$. Then the energy of the vacuum is exactly E_{0}. Since all energies are measured relative to the vacuum, H is positive definite. Analysis of the properties of a_{k} and b_{k} shows that one is the annihilation operator for particles and the other for antiparticles. This is the case of a fermion.

This approach is due to Vladimir Fock, Wendell Furry and Robert Oppenheimer. If one quantizes a real scalar field, then one finds that there is only one kind of annihilation operator; therefore, real scalar fields describe neutral bosons. Since complex scalar fields admit two different kinds of annihilation operators, which are related by conjugation, such fields describe charged bosons.

=== Feynman–Stückelberg interpretation ===
By considering the propagation of the negative energy modes of the electron field backward in time, Ernst Stückelberg reached a pictorial understanding of the fact that the particle and antiparticle have equal mass m and spin J but opposite charges q. This allowed him to rewrite perturbation theory precisely in the form of diagrams. Richard Feynman later gave an independent systematic derivation of these diagrams from a particle formalism, and they are now called Feynman diagrams. Each line of a diagram represents a particle propagating either backward or forward in time. In Feynman diagrams, anti-particles are shown traveling backwards in time relative to normal matter, and vice versa. This technique is the most widespread method of computing amplitudes in quantum field theory today.

Since this picture was first developed by Stückelberg, and acquired its modern form in Feynman's work, it is called the Feynman–Stückelberg interpretation of antiparticles to honor both scientists.

== See also ==
- List of particles
- Antimatter
- Gravitational interaction of antimatter
- Parity, charge conjugation, and time reversal symmetry
- CP violations
- Quantum field theory
- Baryogenesis, baryon asymmetry, and Leptogenesis
- One-electron universe
- Paul Dirac
