= Annihilation =

Collision of a particle and its antiparticle

A Feynman diagram showing the mutual annihilation of a bound state electron positron pair into two photons. This bound state is more commonly known as positronium.

In particle physics, annihilation is the process that occurs when a subatomic particle collides with its respective antiparticle to produce other particles, such as an electron colliding with a positron to produce two photons. The total energy and momentum of the initial pair are conserved in the process and distributed among a set of other particles in the final state. Antiparticles have exactly opposite additive quantum numbers from particles, so the sums of all quantum numbers of such an original pair are zero. Hence, any set of particles may be produced whose total quantum numbers are also zero as long as conservation of energy, conservation of momentum, and conservation of spin are obeyed.

During a low-energy annihilation, photon production is favored, since these particles have no mass. High-energy particle colliders produce annihilations where a wide variety of exotic heavy particles are created.

The word "annihilation" takes its use informally for the interaction of two particles that are not mutual antiparticles – not charge conjugate. Some quantum numbers may then not sum to zero in the initial state, but conserve with the same totals in the final state. An example is the "annihilation" of a high-energy electron antineutrino with an electron to produce a W^{−} boson.

If the annihilating particles are composite, such as mesons or baryons, then multiple different particles are typically produced in the final state.

The inverse of annihilation is pair production, the process in which a high-energy photon converts its energy into mass.

== History ==
Paul Dirac introduced annihilation in 1931. His paper was named "On the Annihilation of Electrons and Protons" because he had not yet realized the positive charge (negative energy) states were anti-electrons. Annihilation was used to verify the existence of the antiproton in 1956.

== Production of a single boson ==
If the initial two particles are elementary (not composite), then they may combine to produce only a single elementary boson, such as a photon (γ), gluon (g), Z, or a Higgs boson (H^{0}). If the total energy in the center-of-momentum frame is equal to the rest mass of a real boson (which is impossible for a massless boson such as the γ), then that created particle will continue to exist until it decays according to its lifetime. Otherwise, the process is understood as the initial creation of a boson that is virtual, which immediately converts into a real particle + antiparticle pair. This is called an s-channel process. An example is the annihilation of an electron with a positron to produce a virtual photon, which converts into a muon and anti-muon. If the energy is large enough, a Z could replace the photon.

== Examples ==
=== Electron–positron annihilation ===
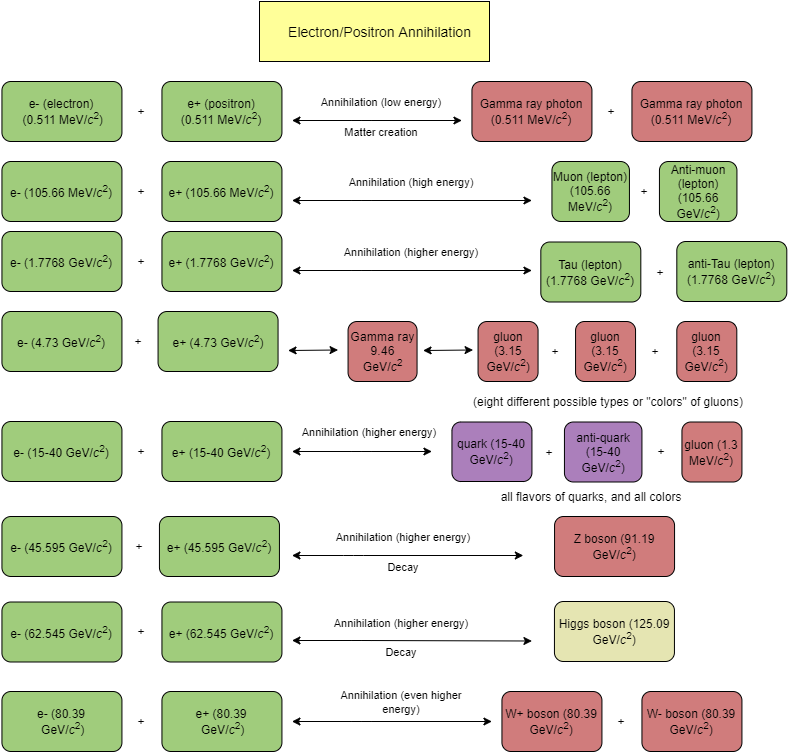
Electron/positron annihilation at various energies

e^{−} + e^{+} → γ + γ

When a low-energy electron annihilates a low-energy positron (antielectron) the most probable result is the creation of two or more photons, since the only other final-state Standard Model particles that electrons and positrons carry enough mass–energy to produce are neutrinos, which are approximately 10,000 times less likely to produce, and the creation of only one photon is impossible by momentum conservation—a single photon would carry nonzero momentum in any frame, including the center-of-momentum frame where the total momentum vanishes. Both the annihilating electron and positron particles have a rest energy of about 0.511 million electron-volts (MeV). If their kinetic energies are relatively negligible, this total rest energy appears as the photon energy of the photons produced. Each of the photons then has an energy of about 0.511 MeV. Momentum and energy are both conserved, with 1.012 MeV of photon energy (accounting for the rest energy of the particles) moving in opposite directions (accounting for the total zero momentum of the system).

If one or both charged particles carry a larger amount of kinetic energy, various other particles can be produced. Furthermore, the annihilation (or decay) of an electron–positron pair into a single photon can occur in the presence of a third charged particle, to which the excess momentum can be transferred by a virtual photon from the electron or positron. The inverse process, pair production by a single real photon, is also possible in the electromagnetic field of a third particle.

=== Proton–antiproton annihilation ===
When a proton encounters its antiparticle (and more generally, if any species of baryon encounters the corresponding antibaryon), the reaction is not as simple as electron–positron annihilation. Unlike an electron, a proton is a composite particle consisting of three "valence quarks" and an indeterminate number of "sea quarks" bound by gluons. Thus, when a proton encounters an antiproton, one of its quarks, usually a constituent valence quark, may annihilate with an antiquark (which more rarely could be a sea quark) to produce a gluon, after which the gluon together with the remaining quarks, antiquarks, and gluons will undergo a complex process of rearrangement (called hadronization or fragmentation) into a number of mesons (mostly pions and kaons), which will share the total energy and momentum. The newly created mesons are unstable, and unless they encounter and interact with some other material, they will decay in a series of reactions that ultimately produce only photons, electrons, positrons, and neutrinos. This type of reaction will occur between any baryon (particle consisting of three quarks) and any antibaryon consisting of three antiquarks, one of which corresponds to a quark in the baryon. (This reaction is unlikely if at least one among the baryon and anti-baryon is exotic enough that they share no constituent quark flavors.) Antiprotons can and do annihilate with neutrons, and likewise antineutrons can annihilate with protons, as discussed below.

Reactions in which proton–antiproton annihilation produces as many as 9 mesons have been observed, while production of 13 mesons is theoretically possible. The generated mesons leave the site of the annihilation at moderate fractions of the speed of light and decay with whatever lifetime is appropriate for their type of meson.

Similar reactions will occur when an antinucleon annihilates within a more complex atomic nucleus, save that the resulting mesons, being strongly interacting, have a significant probability of being absorbed by one of the remaining "spectator" nucleons rather than escaping. Since the absorbed energy can be as much as ~2 GeV, it can in principle exceed the binding energy of even the heaviest nuclei. Thus, when an antiproton annihilates inside a heavy nucleus such as uranium or plutonium, partial or complete disruption of the nucleus can occur, releasing large numbers of fast neutrons. Such reactions open the possibility for triggering a significant number of secondary fission reactions in a subcritical mass and may potentially be useful for spacecraft propulsion.

=== Higgs production ===
In collisions of two nucleons at very high energies, sea quarks and gluons tend to dominate the interaction rate, so neither nucleon need be an anti-particle for annihilation of a quark pair or "fusion" of two gluons to occur. Examples of such processes contribute to the production of the long-sought Higgs boson. The Higgs is directly produced very weakly by annihilation of light (valence) quarks, but heavy t or b sea or produced quarks are available. In 2012, the CERN laboratory in Geneva announced the discovery of the Higgs in the debris from proton–proton collisions at the Large Hadron Collider (LHC). The strongest Higgs yield is from fusion of two gluons (via annihilation of a heavy quark pair), while two quarks or antiquarks produce more easily identified events through radiation of a Higgs by a produced virtual vector boson or annihilation of two such vector bosons.

== See also ==
- Pair production
- Creation and annihilation operators
- Photon energy
- Annihilation radiation
