= Thomas Ypsilantis =

American physicist

- Born: June 24, 1928; Salt Lake City, Utah
- Died: August 16, 2000 (aged 72); Geneva, Switzerland
- Education: University of Utah; University of California, Berkeley
- Known for: Co-discovery of the antiproton Developing the RICH detector
- Scientific career
- Fields: Particle physics
- Workplaces: CERN
- Thesis: Experiments on polarization in nucleon-nucleon scattering at 310 MeV (1955)
- Doctoral advisor: Emilio Segrè

Thomas John Ypsilantis (Greek: Θωμάς Υψηλάντης; June 24, 1928 – August 16, 2000) was an American physicist of Greek descent. Ypsilantis was known for the co-discovery of the antiproton in 1955, along with Owen Chamberlain, Emilio Segrè, and Clyde Wiegand. Following this work, he moved to CERN to develop Cherenkov radiation detectors for use in particle physics.

== Biography ==
Tom Ypsilantis was born in Salt Lake City in 1928. His father was killed by lightning in 1931. He graduated from South High School in 1945, and attended the University of Utah graduating with a degree in chemistry in 1949. He then attended the University of California, Berkeley where he joined the four person team at the Berkeley Bevatron that observed the first antiproton; this became the subject of his PhD thesis and the two senior members of this team won the Nobel Prize in Physics in 1959. Ypsilantis was associate professor of physics at the University of California, Berkeley, and was instrumental in the founding of the Demokritos Research Center in Athens, Greece. In 1969, he went to Geneva to work at CERN (Centre European Research Nucleaire), where he met Jacques Séguinot. In 1977, Ypsilantis and Séguinot proposed the technique later called the Ring Imaging Cherenkov (RICH) counter. Together with Tord Ekelöf, they introduced this technique for high-energy physics: the first large-scale application was for the DELPHI experiment at LEP. They later worked in the framework of the LAAS Project on noble-liquid calorimetry and on a very large water neutrino detector based on the fast-RICH technique. Ypsilantis also made major contributions to the LHCb experiment at CERN. He served as the Senior Research Director in Geneva, Project Director in Bologna, Italy, and Consultant to the French Nuclear Agency in Saclay, France.
