= Antiproton =

Subatomic particle

- The quark content of the antiproton.
- Classification: Antibaryon
- Composition: 2 up antiquarks, 1 down antiquark
- Statistics: Fermionic
- Family: Hadron
- Interactions: Strong, weak, electromagnetic, gravitation
- Symbol: p̅
- Antiparticle: Proton
- Theorised: Paul Dirac (1933)
- Discovered: Emilio Segrè & Owen Chamberlain (1955)
- Mass: 1.67262192595(52)×10^{−27} kg 938.27208943(29) MeV/c^{2}
- Mean lifetime: the same as that of the proton (> 0.96×10^{30} years (stable))
- Electric charge: −1 e
- Magnetic moment: −2.7928473441(42) μ_{N}
- Spin: 1/2 ħ
- Isospin: −1/2

The antiproton, p̅, (pronounced p-bar) is the antiparticle of the proton. Antiprotons are stable, but they are typically short-lived, since any collision with a proton will cause both particles to be annihilated in a burst of energy.

The existence of the antiproton with electric charge of −1 e, opposite to the electric charge of +1 e of the proton, was predicted by Paul Dirac in his 1933 Nobel Prize lecture. Dirac received the Nobel Prize for his 1928 publication of his Dirac equation that predicted the existence of positive and negative solutions to Einstein's mass–energy equation (E = mc^{2}) and the existence of the positron, the antimatter analog of the electron, with opposite charge and magnetic moment.

The antiproton was first experimentally confirmed in 1955 at the Bevatron particle accelerator by University of California, Berkeley physicists Emilio Segrè and Owen Chamberlain, for which they were awarded the 1959 Nobel Prize in Physics.

In terms of valence quarks, an antiproton consists of two up antiquarks and one down antiquark (u̅u̅d̅). The properties of the antiproton that have been measured all match the corresponding properties of the proton, with the exception that the antiproton has electric charge and magnetic moment that are the opposites of those in the proton, which is to be expected from the antimatter equivalent of a proton. The questions of how matter is different from antimatter, and the relevance of antimatter in explaining how our universe survived the Big Bang, remain open problems, in part, due to the relative scarcity of antimatter in today's universe.

== Occurrence in nature ==
Antiprotons have been detected in cosmic rays beginning in 1979, first by balloon-borne experiments and more recently by satellite-based detectors. The standard picture for their presence in cosmic rays is that they are produced in collisions of cosmic ray protons with atomic nuclei in the interstellar medium, via the reaction, where A denotes a nucleus:

p + A → p + p̅ + p + A

The secondary antiprotons (p̅) then propagate through the Milky Way galaxy, confined by the galactic magnetic fields. Their energy spectrum is modified by collisions with other atoms in the interstellar medium, and antiprotons can also be lost by "leaking out" of the galaxy.

A belt of antiprotons surrounding Earth was reported in 2011 by the team behind the PAMELA detector (Payload for Antimatter/Matter Exploration and Light-nuclei Astrophysics). The antiprotons are trapped by Earth's magnetic field, and similar antiproton belts may exist around the giant planets. Interactions between cosmic rays and Saturn's rings may produce the largest number of antiprotons in the solar system.

The antiproton cosmic ray energy spectrum is now measured reliably and is consistent with this standard picture of antiproton production by cosmic ray collisions. These experimental measurements set upper limits on the number of antiprotons that could be produced in exotic ways, such as from annihilation of supersymmetric dark matter particles in the galaxy or from the Hawking radiation caused by the evaporation of primordial black holes. This also provides a lower limit on the antiproton lifetime of about 1.7 million years. Since the galactic storage time of antiprotons is about 10 million years, an intrinsic decay lifetime would modify the galactic residence time and distort the spectrum of cosmic ray antiprotons. This is significantly more stringent than the best laboratory measurements of the antiproton lifetime:

- LEAR collaboration at CERN: 0.08 years
- Antihydrogen Penning trap of Gabrielse et al.: 0.28 years
- BASE experiment at CERN: 10.2 years
- APEX collaboration at Fermilab: 50000 years for p̅ → μ^{−} + anything
- APEX collaboration at Fermilab: 300000 years for p̅ → e^{−} + γ

The magnitude of properties of the antiproton are predicted by CPT symmetry to be exactly related to those of the proton. In particular, CPT symmetry predicts the mass and lifetime of the antiproton to be the same as those of the proton, and the electric charge and magnetic moment of the antiproton to be opposite in sign and equal in magnitude to those of the proton. CPT symmetry is a basic consequence of quantum field theory and no violations of it have ever been detected.

=== List of recent cosmic ray detection experiments ===
- BESS: balloon-borne experiment, flown in 1993, 1995, 1997, 2000, 2002, 2004 (Polar-I) and 2007 (Polar-II).
- CAPRICE: balloon-borne experiment, flown in 1994 and 1998.
- HEAT: balloon-borne experiment, flown in 2000.
- AMS: space-based experiment, prototype flown on the Space Shuttle in 1998, intended for the International Space Station, launched May 2011.
- PAMELA: satellite experiment to detect cosmic rays and antimatter from space, launched June 2006. Recent report discovered 28 antiprotons in the South Atlantic Anomaly.

== Modern experiments and applications ==
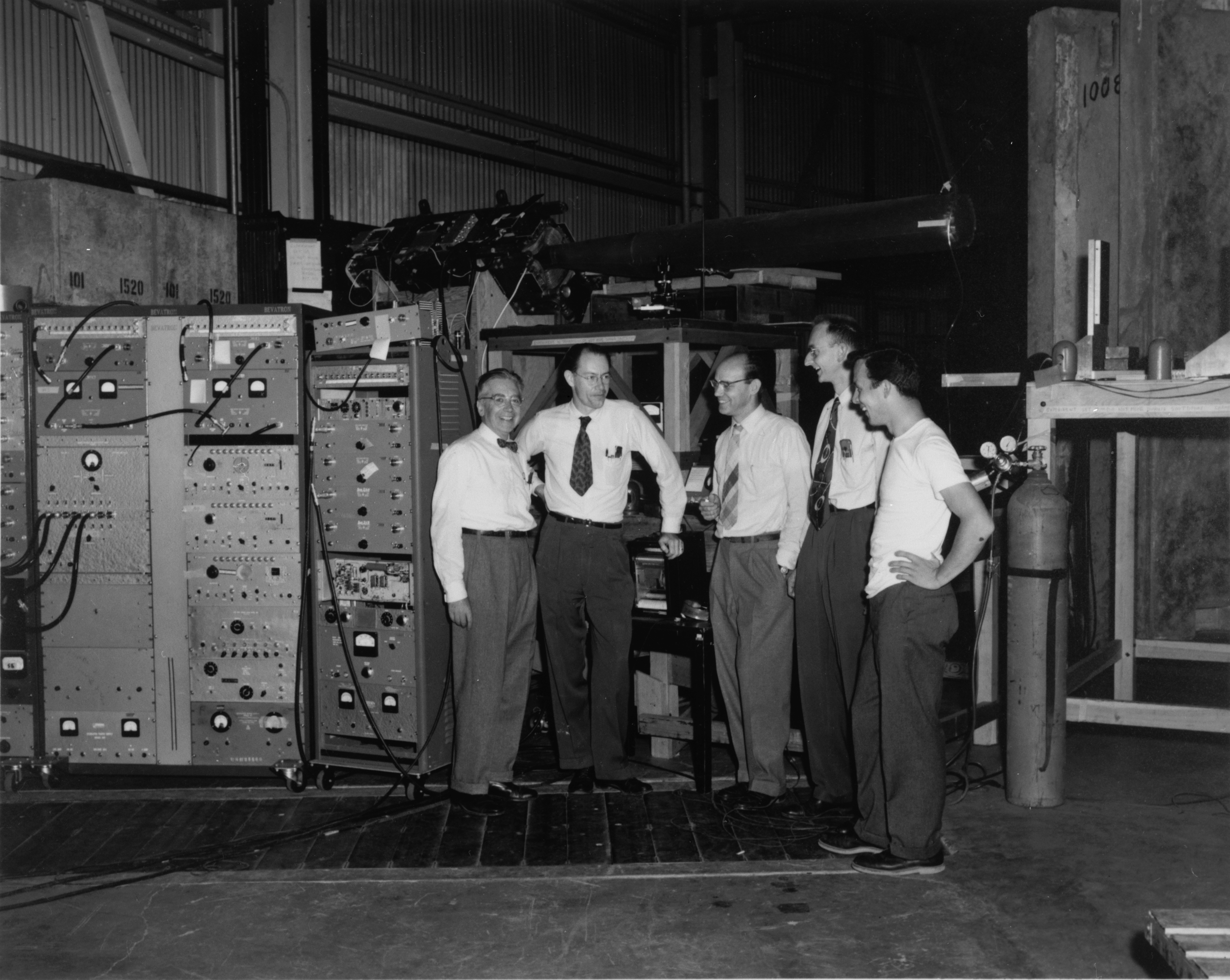
BEV-938. Antiproton set-up with work group: Emilio Segre, Clyde Wiegand, Edward J. Lofgren, Owen Chamberlain, Thomas Ypsilantis, 1955

=== Production ===
Antiprotons were routinely produced at Fermilab for collider physics operations in the Tevatron, where they were collided with protons. The use of antiprotons allows for a higher average energy of collisions between quarks and antiquarks than would be possible in proton–proton collisions. This is because the valence quarks in the proton, and the valence antiquarks in the antiproton, tend to carry the largest fraction of the proton or antiproton's momentum.

Formation of antiprotons requires energy equivalent to a temperature of 10 trillion K (10^{13} K), and this does not tend to happen naturally. However, at CERN, protons are accelerated in the Proton Synchrotron to an energy of 26 GeV and then smashed into an iridium rod. The protons bounce off the iridium nuclei with enough energy for matter to be “created” (transforming kinetic energy into new matter particles). A range of particles and antiparticles are formed, and the antiprotons are separated off using magnets in vacuum.

On 24 March 2026, the BASE experiment team at CERN successfully transported a cloud of 92 antiprotons accumulated in a portable cryogenic Penning trap after disconnecting it from the experimental facility, loading the trap onto a truck, transporting it across CERN’s main site and then again continuing experiment operation with the same antimatter after transport, overcoming limitations of antimatter being difficult to preserve as it annihilates upon contact with matter.

=== Measurements ===
In July 2011, the ASACUSA experiment at CERN determined the mass of the antiproton to be 1836.1526736(23) times that of the electron. This is the same as the mass of a proton, within the level of certainty of the experiment.

In October 2017, scientists working on the BASE experiment at CERN reported a measurement of the antiproton magnetic moment to a precision of 1.5 parts per billion. It is consistent with the most precise measurement of the proton magnetic moment (also made by BASE in 2014), which supports the hypothesis of CPT symmetry. This measurement represents the first time that a property of antimatter is known more precisely than the equivalent property in matter.

In January 2022, by comparing the charge-to-mass ratios between an antiproton and a negatively charged hydrogen ion, the BASE experiment has determined the antiproton's charge-to-mass ratio is identical to that of the proton, down to 16 parts per trillion.

=== Possible applications ===
Antiprotons have been shown within laboratory experiments to have the potential to treat certain cancers, in a similar method currently used for ion (proton) therapy. The primary difference between antiproton therapy and proton therapy is that following ion energy deposition the antiproton annihilates, depositing additional energy in the cancerous region.

== See also ==
- Antineutron
- Deuterium § Antideuterium
- Antiprotonic helium
- List of particles
- Recycling antimatter
- Positron
