= Clyde Wiegand =

American physicist (1915–1996)

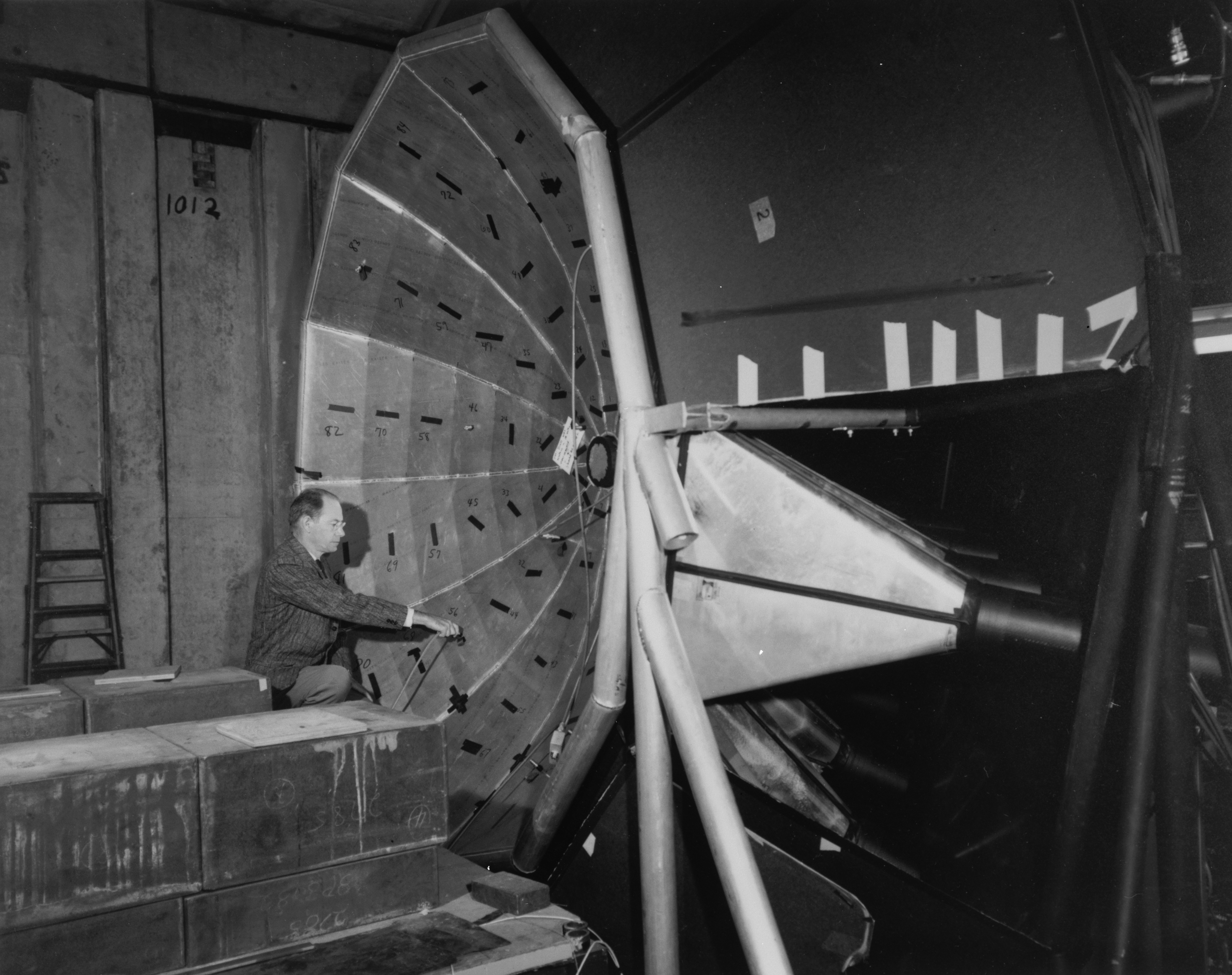
Wiegand at the Lawrence Berkeley National Laboratory

Clyde Wiegand (May 23, 1915, Long Beach, Washington – July 5, 1996) was an American physicist.

Wiegand received his undergraduate degree from Willamette University in 1940. He began his graduate work in physics in 1941 at UC Berkeley.

He was best known for the co-discovery of the antiproton in 1955, along with Owen Chamberlain, Emilio Segrè, and Thomas Ypsilantis. He was also an important contributor to the research of the atomic bomb.

He died at his home in Oakland, California of prostate cancer, aged 81.
