= Bruce Cork =

American physicist (1916–1994)

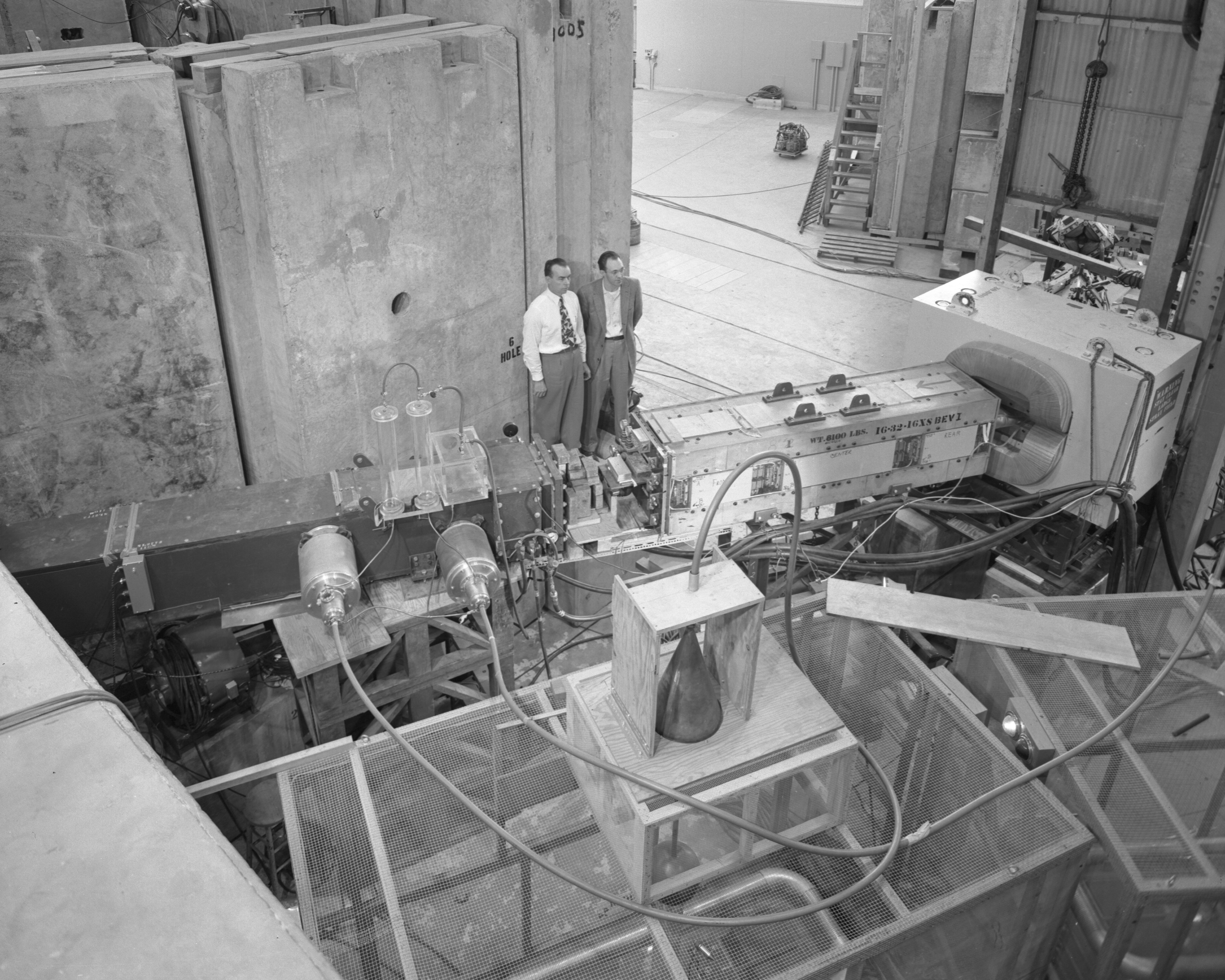
Cork and Glen Lambertson in the laboratory in 1958

Bruce Cork (1916 – October 7, 1994) was a theoretical physicist who discovered the antineutron in 1956 while working at the Lawrence Berkeley National Laboratory. He retired from Lawrence in 1986. He died October 7, 1994, at the age of 78 after a long illness.
