= Emilio Segrè =

Italian-American nuclear physicist and radiochemist (1905–1989)

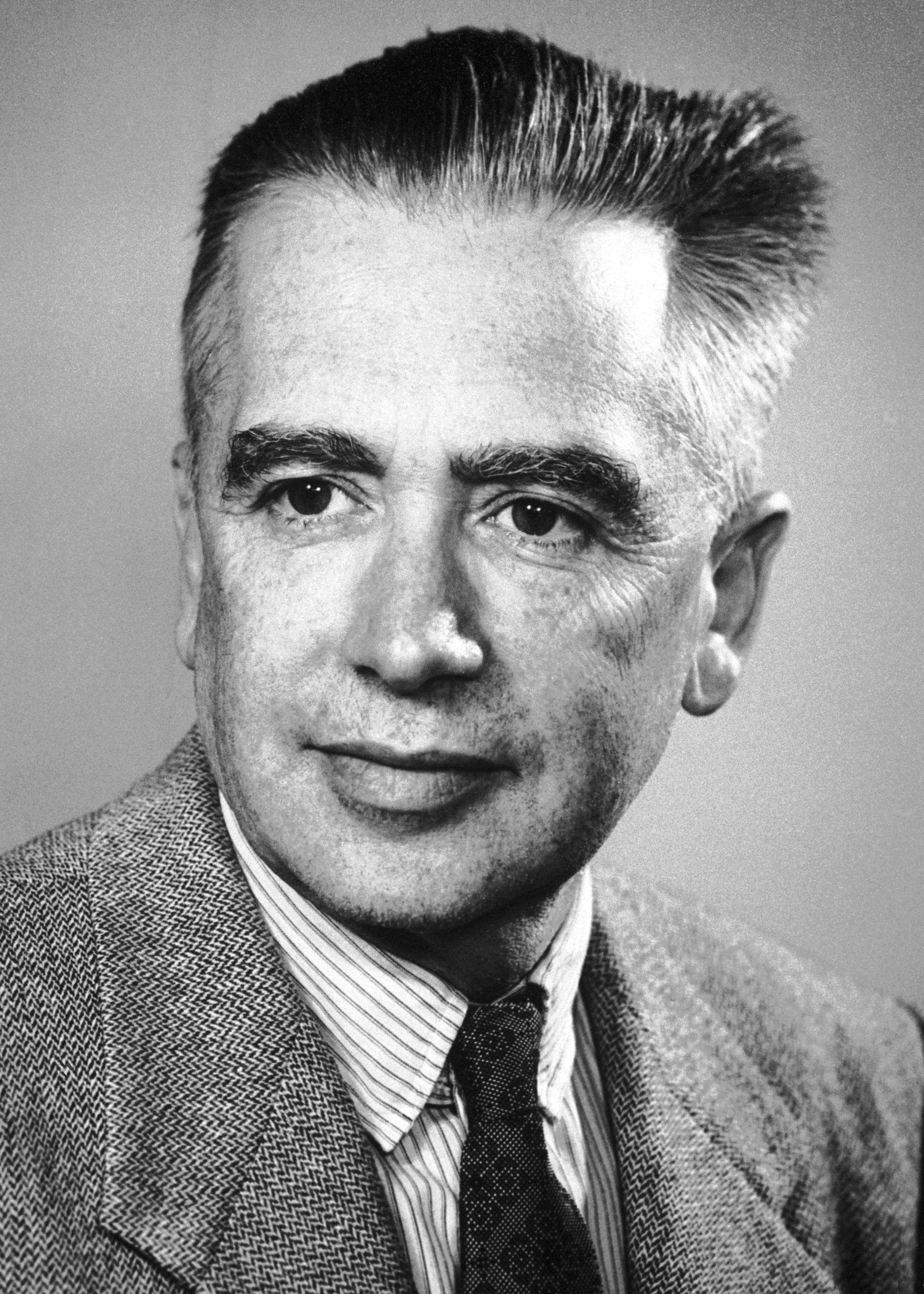
- Segrè in 1959
- Born: Emilio Gino Segrè; 1 February 1905; Tivoli, Lazio, Kingdom of Italy
- Died: 22 April 1989 (aged 84); Lafayette, California, U.S.
- Citizenship: Italy; United States (1944–1989)
- Education: Sapienza University of Rome (laurea, 1928)
- Known for: Discovering technetium (1937); Discovering astatine (1940); Discovering the antiproton (1955)
- Spouses: Elfriede Spiro (m. 1936; died 1970) Rosa Mines (m. 1972)
- Children: 3
- Relatives: Gino Segrè (nephew); Julie Segre (grand-niece); Kristine Yaffe (grand-niece)
- Awards: Richtmyer Memorial Award (1957); Nobel Prize in Physics (1959)
- Scientific career
- Fields: Nuclear physics; Radiochemistry
- Workplaces: Sapienza University of Rome (1932–1936, 1973–1974); University of Palermo (1936–1938); University of California, Berkeley (1938–1943, 1946–1973); Los Alamos Laboratory (1943–1946)
- Doctoral advisor: Enrico Fermi
- Doctoral students: Herbert York (1949); Samarendra Nath Ghoshal (c. 1950); Thomas Ypsilantis (1955)

Emilio Gino Segrè (/səˈɡreɪ/ sə-GRAY; Italian: [eˈmiːljo ˈdʒiːno seˈgrɛ]; 1 February 1905 – 22 April 1989) was an Italian-American nuclear physicist and radiochemist who discovered the elements technetium and astatine, and the antiproton, a subatomic antiparticle, for which he was awarded the Nobel Prize in Physics in 1959, along with Owen Chamberlain.

Born in Tivoli, near Rome, Segrè studied engineering at the University of Rome La Sapienza before taking up physics in 1927. Segrè was appointed assistant professor of physics at the University of Rome in 1932 and worked there until 1936, becoming one of the Via Panisperna boys. From 1936 to 1938 he was director of the Physics Laboratory at the University of Palermo. After a visit to Ernest O. Lawrence's Berkeley Radiation Laboratory, he was sent a molybdenum strip from the laboratory's cyclotron accelerator in 1937, which was emitting anomalous forms of radioactivity. Using careful chemical and theoretical analysis, Segrè was able to prove that some of the radiation was being produced by a previously unknown element, named technetium, the first artificially synthesized chemical element that does not occur in nature.

In 1938 and while Segrè was visiting the Berkeley Radiation laboratory, Benito Mussolini's fascist government passed antisemitic laws barring Jews from university positions. As a Jew, Segrè was rendered an indefinite émigré. At the Berkeley Radiation Lab, Lawrence offered him an underpaid job as a research assistant. There, Segrè helped discover the element astatine and the isotope plutonium-239, which was later used to make the Fat Man nuclear bomb dropped on Nagasaki. From 1943 to 1946 he worked at the Los Alamos National Laboratory as a group leader for the Manhattan Project. He found in April 1944 that Thin Man, the proposed plutonium gun-type nuclear weapon, would not work due to the presence of plutonium-240 impurities. In 1944, he became a naturalized citizen of the United States. On his return to Berkeley in 1946, he became a professor of physics and of history of science, serving until 1972. Segrè and Owen Chamberlain co-headed a research group at the Lawrence Radiation Laboratory that discovered the antiproton, for which the two shared the 1959 Nobel Prize in Physics.

Segrè was an active photographer who took many pictures documenting events and people in the history of modern science, which were donated to the American Institute of Physics after his death. The American Institute of Physics named its photographic archive of physics history in his honor.

== Early life ==
Emilio Gino Segrè was born into a Sephardic Jewish family in Tivoli, near Rome, on 1 February 1905, the son of Giuseppe Segrè, a businessman who owned a paper mill, and Amelia Susanna Treves. He had two older brothers, Angelo and Marco. His uncle, Gino Segrè, was a law professor. He was educated at the ginnasio in Tivoli and, after the family moved to Rome in 1917, the ginnasio and liceo in Rome. He graduated in July 1922 and enrolled in the University of Rome La Sapienza as an engineering student.

In 1927, Segrè met Franco Rasetti, who introduced him to Enrico Fermi. The two young physics professors were looking for talented students. They attended the Como Conference in September 1927, where Segrè heard lectures from notable physicists including Niels Bohr, Werner Heisenberg, Robert Millikan, Wolfgang Pauli, Max Planck and Ernest Rutherford. Segrè then joined Fermi and Rasetti at their laboratory in Rome. With the help of the director of the Institute of Physics, Orso Mario Corbino, Segrè was able to transfer to physics, and, studying under Fermi, earned his laurea degree in July 1928, with a thesis on "Anomalous Dispersion and Magnetic Rotation".

After a stint in the Italian Army from 1928 to 1929, during which he was a commissioned as a second lieutenant in the antiaircraft artillery, Segrè returned to the laboratory on Via Panisperna. He published his first article, which summarised his thesis, "On anomalous dispersion in mercury and in lithium", jointly with Edoardo Amaldi in 1928, and another article with him the following year on the Raman effect.

In 1930, Segrè began studying the Zeeman effect in certain alkaline metals. When his progress stalled because the diffraction grating he required to continue was not available in Italy, he wrote to four laboratories elsewhere in Europe asking for assistance and received an invitation from Pieter Zeeman to finish his work at Zeeman's laboratory in Amsterdam. Segrè was awarded a Rockefeller Foundation fellowship and, on Fermi's advice, elected to use it to study under Otto Stern in Hamburg. Working with Otto Frisch on space quantization produced results that apparently did not agree with the current theory; but Isidor Isaac Rabi showed that theory and experiment were in agreement if the nuclear spin of potassium was +1/2.

== Physics professor ==
Segrè was appointed assistant professor of physics at the University of Rome in 1932 and worked there until 1936, becoming one of the Via Panisperna boys. In 1934, he met Elfriede Spiro, a Jewish woman whose family had come from Ostrowo in West Prussia, but had fled to Breslau when that part of Prussia became part of Poland after World War I. After the Nazi Party came to power in Germany in 1933, she had emigrated to Italy, where she worked as a secretary and an interpreter. At first she did not speak Italian well, and Segrè and Spiro conversed in German, in which he was fluent. The two were married at the Great Synagogue of Rome on 2 February 1936. He agreed with the rabbi to spend the minimal amount on the wedding, giving the balance of what would be spent on a luxury wedding to Jewish refugees from Germany. The rabbi managed to give them many of the trappings of a luxury wedding anyway. The couple had three children: Claudio, born in 1937, Amelia Gertrude Allegra, born in 1942, and Fausta Irene, born in 1945.

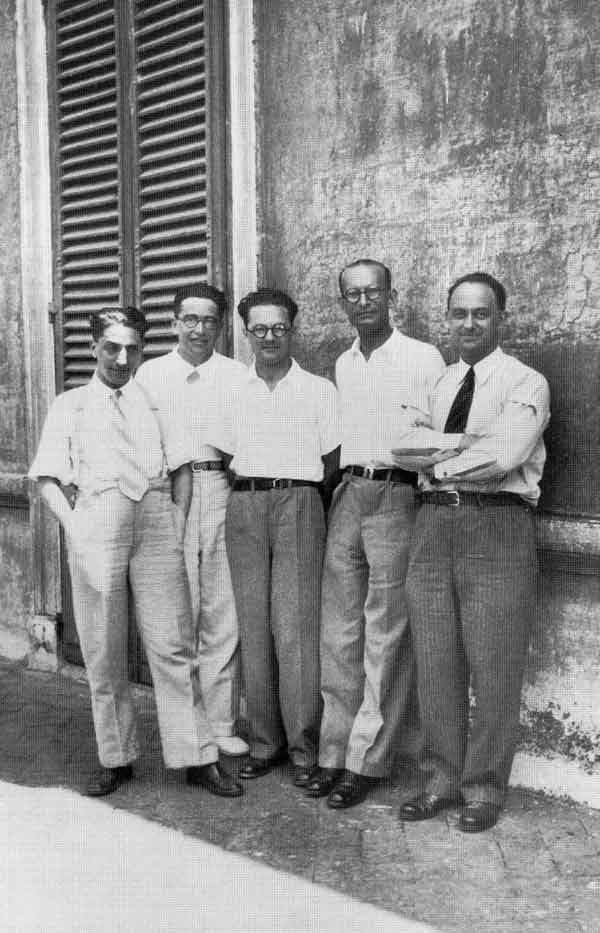
The Via Panisperna boys in the courtyard of Rome University's Physics Institute in Via Panisperna. Left to right: Oscar D'Agostino, Segrè, Edoardo Amaldi, Franco Rasetti and Enrico Fermi.

After marrying, Segrè sought a stable job and became professor of physics and director of the Physics Institute at the University of Palermo. He found the equipment there primitive and the library bereft of modern physics literature, but his colleagues at Palermo included the mathematicians Michele Cipolla and Michele De Franchis, the mineralogist Carlo Perrier and the botanist Luigi Montemartini. In 1936 he paid a visit to Ernest O. Lawrence's Berkeley Radiation Laboratory, where he met Edwin McMillan, Donald Cooksey, Franz Kurie, Philip Abelson and Robert Oppenheimer. Segrè was intrigued by the radioactive scrap metal that had once been part of the laboratory's cyclotron. In Palermo, this was found to contain a number of radioactive isotopes. In February 1937, Lawrence sent him a molybdenum strip that was emitting anomalous forms of radioactivity. Segrè enlisted Perrier's help to subject the strip to careful chemical and theoretical analysis, and they were able to prove that some of the radiation was being produced by a previously unknown element. In 1947 they named it technetium, as it was the first artificially synthesized chemical element.

== Radiation Laboratory ==
In June 1938, Segrè paid a summer visit to California to study the short-lived isotopes of technetium, which did not survive being mailed to Italy. While Segrè was en route, Benito Mussolini's fascist government passed racial laws barring Jews from university positions. As a Jew, Segrè was now rendered an indefinite émigré. The Czechoslovak crisis prompted Segrè to send for Elfriede and Claudio, as he now feared that war in Europe was inevitable. In November 1938 and February 1939 they made quick trips to Mexico to exchange their tourist visas for immigration visa. Both Segrè and Elfriede held grave fears for the fate of their parents in Italy and Germany.

At the Berkeley Radiation Lab, Lawrence offered Segrè a job as a research assistant—a relatively lowly position for someone who had discovered an element—for US$300 (equivalent to $6,900 in 2025) a month for six months. When Lawrence learned that Segrè was legally trapped in California, he took advantage of the situation to reduce Segrè's salary to $116 a month. Working with Glenn Seaborg, Segrè isolated the metastable isotope technetium-99m. Its properties made it ideal for use in nuclear medicine, and it is now used in about 10 million medical diagnostic procedures annually. Segrè went looking for element 93, but did not find it, as he was looking for an element chemically akin to rhenium instead of a rare-earth element, which is what element 93 was. Working with Alexander Langsdorf, Jr., and Chien-Shiung Wu, he discovered xenon-135, which later became important as a nuclear poison in nuclear reactors.

Segrè then turned his attention to another missing element on the periodic table, element 85. After he announced how he intended to create it by bombarding bismuth-209 with alpha particles at a Monday meeting Radiation Laboratory meeting, two of his colleagues, Dale R. Corson and Robert A. Cornog carried out his proposed experiment. Segrè then asked whether he could do the chemistry and, with Kenneth Ross MacKenzie, successfully isolated the new element, which is today called astatine. Segrè and Wu then attempted to find the last remaining missing non-transuranic element, element 61. They had the correct technique for making it, but lacked the chemical methods to separate it. He also worked with Seaborg, McMillan, Joseph W. Kennedy and Arthur C. Wahl to create plutonium-239 in Lawrence's 60-inch (150 cm) cyclotron in December 1940.

== Manhattan Project ==
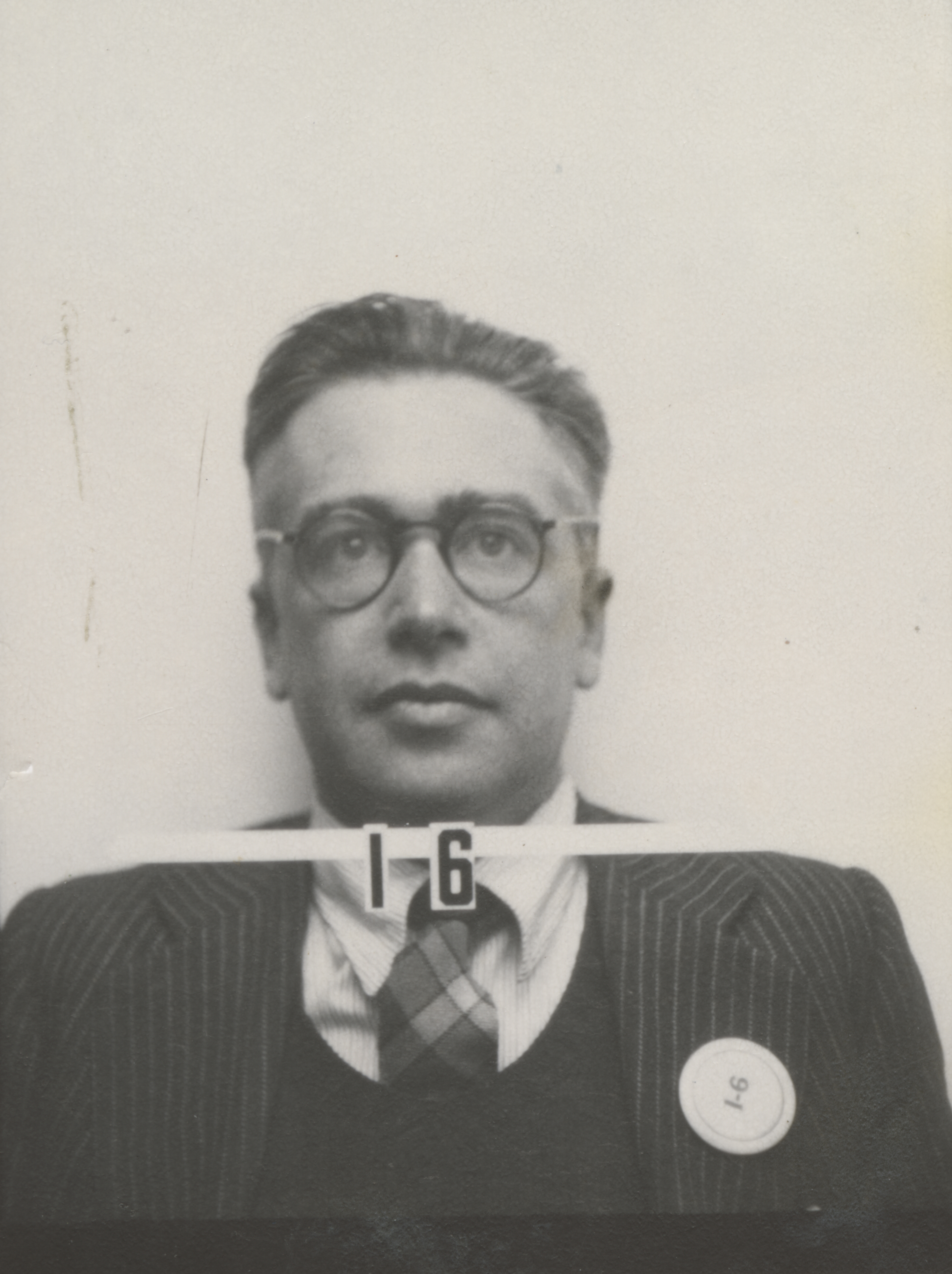
Segrè's ID badge photo from Los Alamos

The Japanese attack on Pearl Harbor in December 1941 and the subsequent United States declaration of war upon Italy rendered Segrè an enemy alien and cut him off from communication with his parents. Physicists began leaving the Radiation Laboratory to do war work, and Raymond T. Birge asked him to teach classes to the remaining students. This provided a useful supplement to Segrè's income, and he established important friendships and professional associations with some of these students, who included Owen Chamberlain and Clyde Wiegand.

In late 1942, Oppenheimer asked Segrè to join the Manhattan Project at its Los Alamos Laboratory. Segrè became the head of the laboratory's P-5 (Radioactivity) Group, which formed part of Robert Bacher's P (Experimental Physics) Division. For security reasons, he was given the cover name of Earl Seaman. He moved to Los Alamos with his family in June 1943.

Segrè's group set up its equipment in a disused Forest Service cabin in the Pajarito Canyon near Los Alamos in August 1943. His group's task was to measure and catalog the radioactivity of various fission products. An important line of research was determining the degree of isotope enrichment achieved with various samples of enriched uranium. Initially, the tests using mass spectrometry, used by Columbia University, and neutron assay, used by Berkeley, gave different results. Segrè studied Berkeley's results and could find no error, while Kenneth Bainbridge likewise found no fault with New York's. However, analysis of another sample showed close agreement. Higher rates of spontaneous fission were observed at Los Alamos, which Segrè's group concluded were due to cosmic rays, which were more prevalent at Los Alamos due to its high altitude.

The group measured the activity of thorium, uranium-234, uranium-235 and uranium-238, but only had access to microgram quantities of plutonium-239. The first sample plutonium produced in the nuclear reactor at Oak Ridge was received in April 1944. Within days the group observed five times the rate of spontaneous fission as with the cyclotron-produced plutonium. This was not news that the leaders of the project wanted to hear. It meant that Thin Man, the proposed plutonium gun-type nuclear weapon, would not work and implied that the project's investment in plutonium production facilities at the Hanford Site was wasted. Segrè's group carefully checked their results and concluded that the increased activity was due to the plutonium-240 isotope.

In June 1944, Segrè was summoned into Oppenheimer's office and informed that while his father was safe, his mother had been rounded up by the Nazis in October 1943. Segrè never saw either of his parents again. His father died in Rome in October 1944. In late 1944, Segrè and Elfriede became naturalized citizens of the United States. His group, now designated R-4, was given responsibility for measuring the gamma radiation from the Trinity nuclear test in July 1945. The blast damaged or destroyed most of the experiments, but enough data was recovered to measure the gamma rays.

== Later life ==
In August 1945, a few days before the surrender of Japan and the end of World War II, Segrè received an offer from Washington University in St. Louis of an associate professorship with a salary of US$5,000 (equivalent to $89,400 in 2025). The following month, the University of Chicago also made him an offer. After some prompting, Birge offered $6,500 and a full professorship, which Segrè decided to accept. He left Los Alamos in January 1946 and returned to Berkeley.

In the late 1940s, many academics left the University of California, lured away by higher-salary offers and by the university's peculiar loyalty oath requirement. Segrè chose to take the oath and stay, but this did not allay suspicions about his loyalty. Luis Alvarez was incensed that Amaldi, Fermi, Pontecorvo, Rasetti and Segrè had chosen to pursue patent claims against the United States for their pre-war discoveries and told Segrè to let him know when Pontecorvo wrote from Russia. He also clashed with Lawrence over the latter's plan to create a rival nuclear-weapons laboratory to Los Alamos in Livermore, California, in order to develop the hydrogen bomb, a weapon that Segrè felt would be of dubious utility.

Unhappy with his deteriorating relationships with his colleagues and with the poisonous political atmosphere at Berkeley caused by the loyalty oath controversy, Segrè accepted a job offer from the University of Illinois at Urbana–Champaign. The courts ultimately resolved the patent claims in the Italian scientists' favour in 1953, awarding them US$400,000 (equivalent to $4,800,000 in 2025) for the patents related to generating neutrons, which worked out to about $20,000 after legal costs. Kennedy, Seaborg, Wahl and Segrè were subsequently awarded the same amount for their discovery of plutonium, which came to $100,000 after being divided four ways, there being no legal fees this time.

After turning down offers from IBM and the Brookhaven National Laboratory, Segrè returned to Berkeley in 1952. He was elected to the United States National Academy of Sciences that same year. He moved his family from Berkeley to nearby Lafayette, California, in 1955. Working with Chamberlain and others, he began searching for the antiproton, a subatomic antiparticle of the proton. The antiparticle of the electron, the positron had been predicted by Paul Dirac in 1931 and then discovered by Carl D. Anderson in 1932. By analogy, it was now expected that there would be an antiparticle corresponding to the proton, but no one had found one, and even in 1955 some scientists doubted that it existed. Using Lawrence's Bevatron set to 6 GeV, they managed to detect conclusive evidence of antiprotons. Chamberlain and Segrè were awarded the 1959 Nobel Prize in Physics for their discovery. This was controversial, because Clyde Wiegand and Thomas Ypsilantis were co-authors of the same article, but did not share the prize.

Segrè served on the university's powerful Budget Committee from 1961 to 1965 and was chairman of the Physics Department from 1965 to 1966. He supported Teller's successful bid to separate the Lawrence Berkeley Laboratory from the Lawrence Livermore Laboratory in 1970. He was elected to the American Philosophical Society in 1963. He was one of the trustees of Fermilab from 1965 to 1968. He attended its inauguration with Laura Fermi in 1974. During the 1950s, Segrè edited Fermi's papers. He later published a biography of Fermi, Enrico Fermi: Physicist (1970). He published his own lecture notes as From X-rays to Quarks: Modern Physicists and Their Discoveries (1980) and From Falling Bodies to Radio Waves: Classical Physicists and Their Discoveries (1984). He also edited the Annual Review of Nuclear and Particle Science from 1958 to 1977 and wrote an autobiography, A Mind Always in Motion (1993), which was published posthumously.

Elfriede died in October 1970, and Segrè married Rosa Mines in February 1972. He was elected to the American Academy of Arts and Sciences in 1973. That year he reached the University of California's compulsory retirement age. He continued teaching the history of physics. In 1974 he returned to the University of Rome as a professor, but served only a year before reaching the mandatory retirement age. Segrè died from a heart attack at the age of 84 while out walking near his home in Lafayette. Active as a photographer, Segrè took many photos documenting events and people in the history of modern science. After his death Rosa donated many of his photographs to the American Institute of Physics, which named its photographic archive of physics history in his honor. The collection was bolstered by a subsequent bequest from Rosa after her death from an accident in Tivoli in 1997.

== See also ==
- List of Jewish Nobel laureates

== Bibliography ==
- E. Segrè (1964). Nuclei and Particles.
- E. Segrè (1970). Enrico Fermi, Physicist, University of Chicago Press.
  - eBook published by Plunkett Lake Press (2016). ASIN B01M30L2QS.
- E. Segrè (1980). From X-rays to Quarks: Modern Physicists and Their Discoveries (Dover Classics of Science & Mathematics), Dover Publications.
- E. Segrè (1984). From Falling Bodies to Radio Waves: Classical Physicists and Their Discoveries.
- Segrè, Emilio (1993). A Mind Always in Motion: the Autobiography of Emilio Segrè. Berkeley, California: University of California Press. ISBN 978-0-520-07627-3. OCLC 25629433. Free Online – UC Press E-Books Collection.
  - eBook published by Plunkett Lake Press (2016). ASIN B01M3S03Q0.
