= Owen Chamberlain =

American physicist (1920–2006)

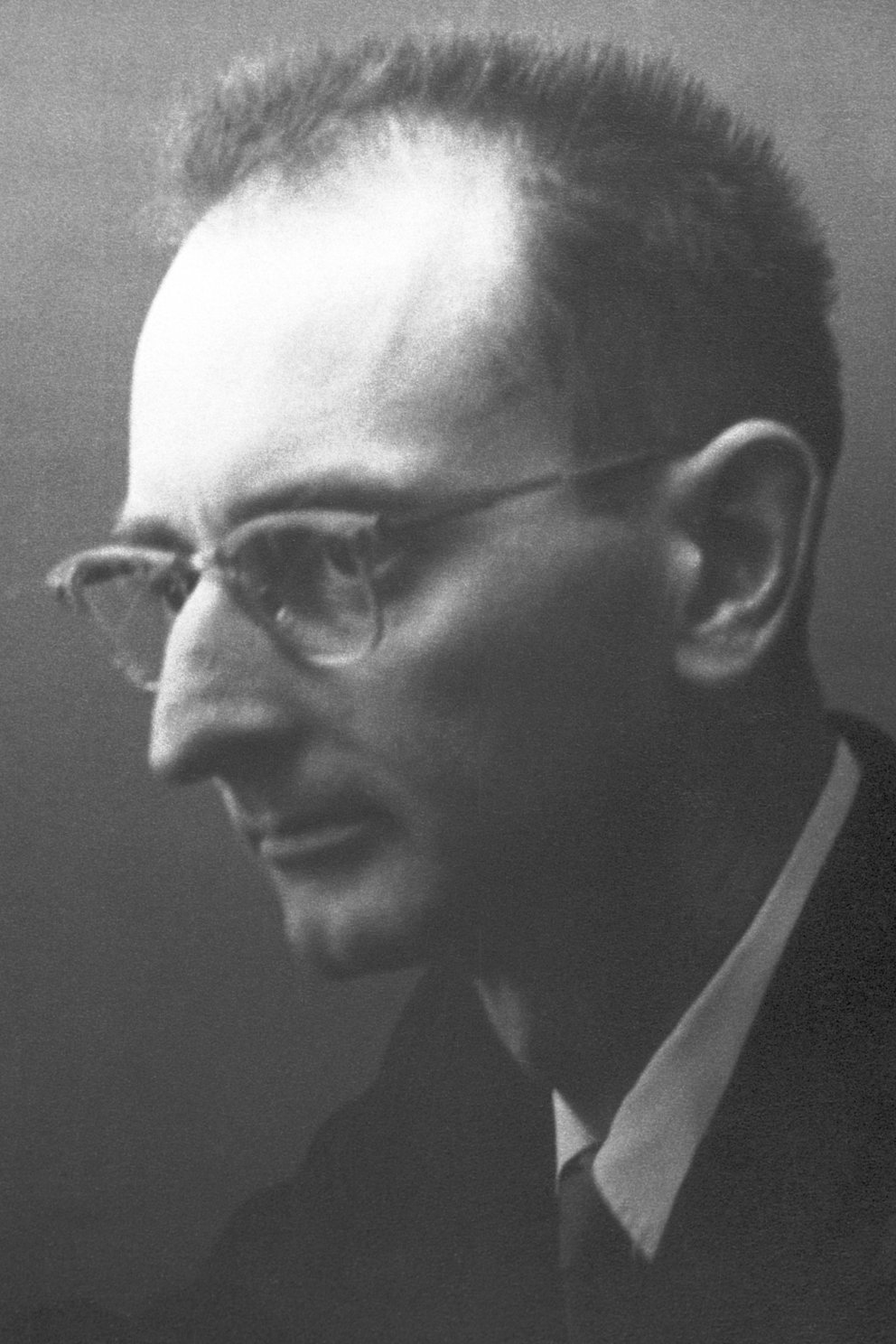
- Chamberlain in 1959
- Born: July 10, 1920; San Francisco, California, U.S.
- Died: February 28, 2006 (aged 85); Berkeley, California, U.S.
- Education: Dartmouth College; University of California, Berkeley; University of Chicago
- Known for: Particle physics
- Spouse(s): Beatrice Babette Cooper (m. 1943, d. 1988); June Steingart Greenfield (d. 1991); Senta Pugh-Chamberlain (née Gaiser)
- Awards: Nobel Prize in Physics, 1959
- Scientific career
- Fields: Physics
- Workplaces: Los Alamos National Laboratory; University of California, Berkeley
- Doctoral advisor: Enrico Fermi
- Doctoral students: Paul Grannis, Nathan Isgur, David Delano Clark

Owen Chamberlain (July 10, 1920 – February 28, 2006) was an American physicist who shared with Emilio Segrè the Nobel Prize in Physics for the discovery of the antiproton, a sub-atomic antiparticle.

== Biography ==
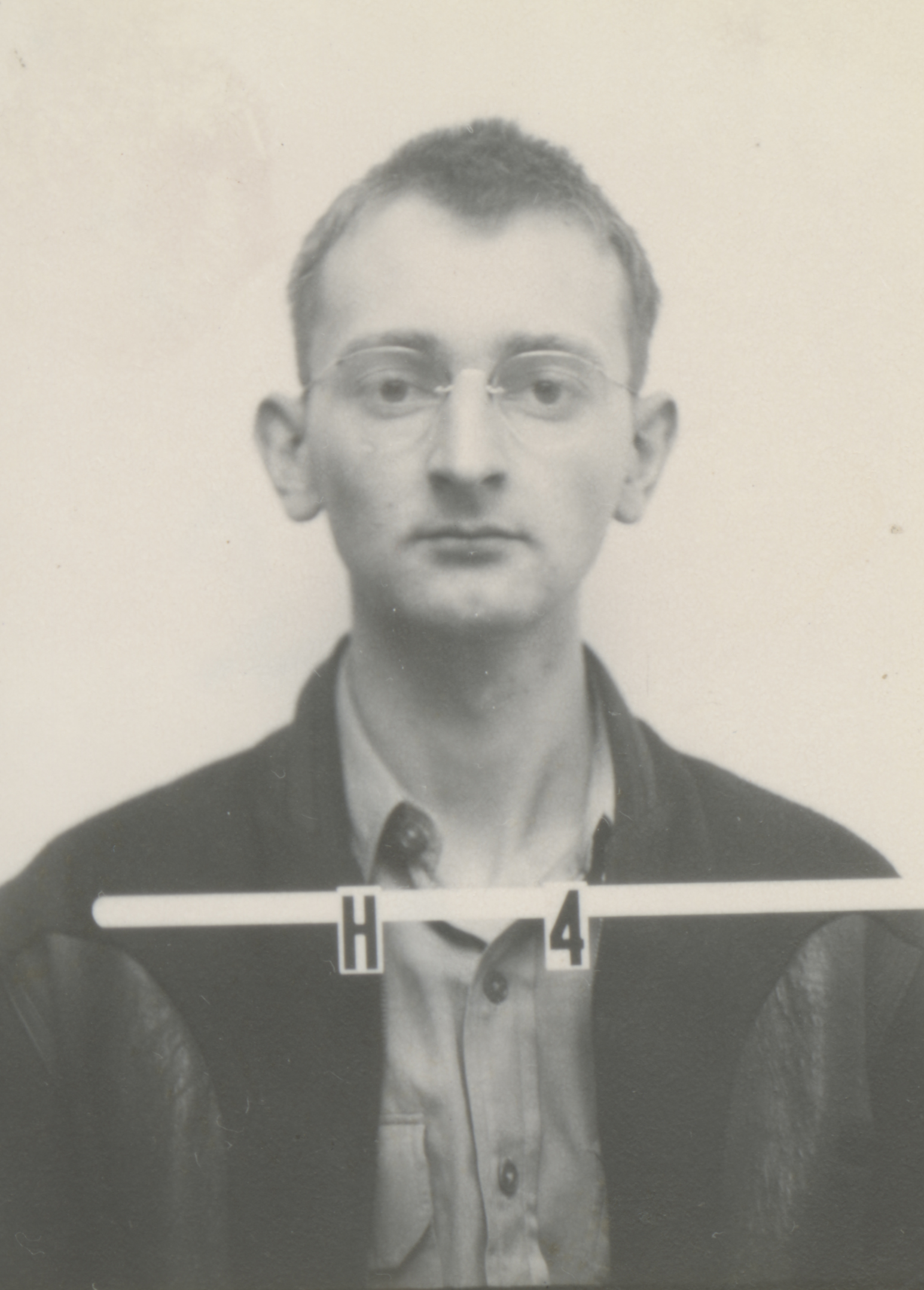
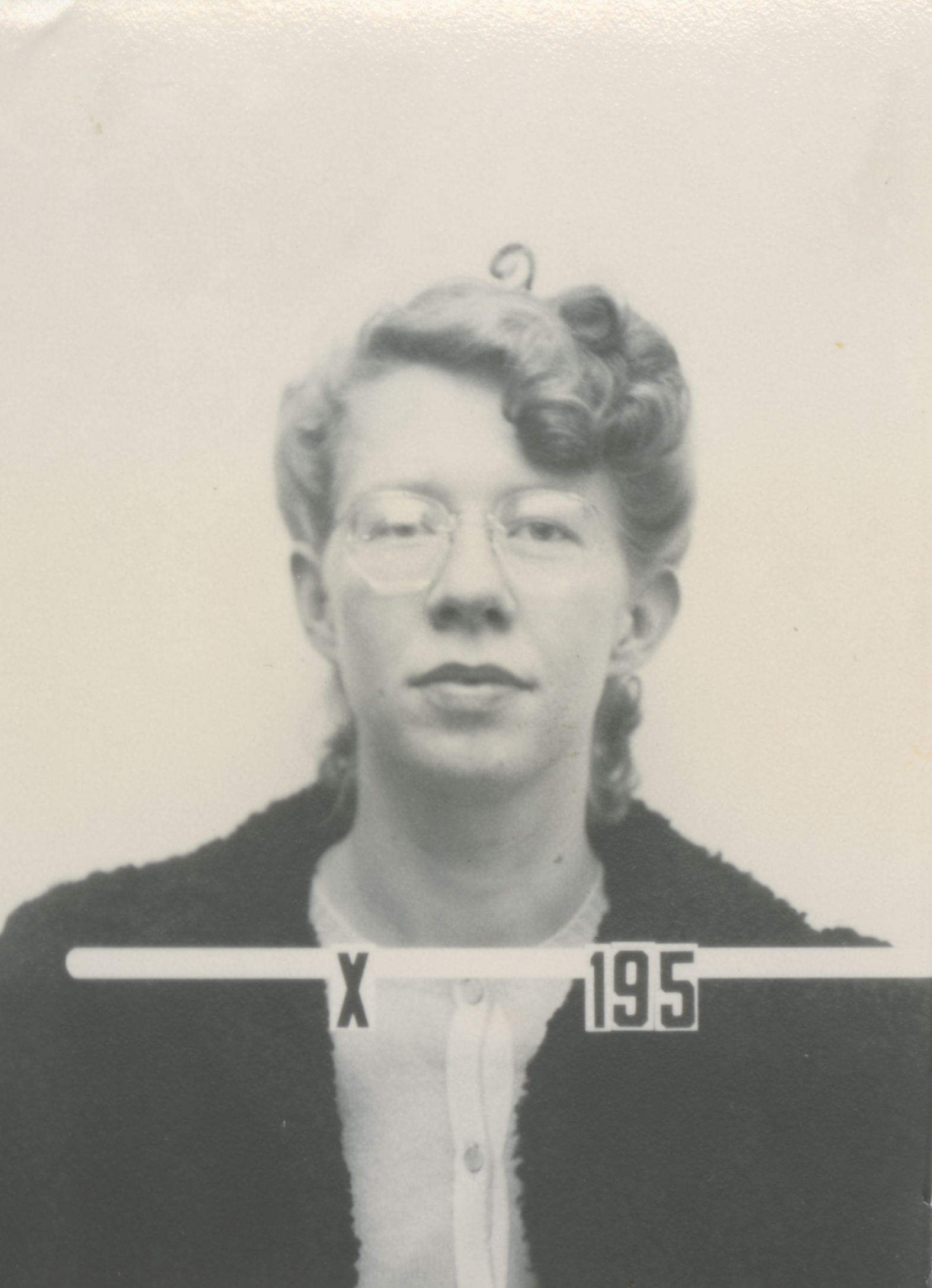
Owen and Babette Chamberlain Los Alamos badges

Born in San Francisco, California, Chamberlain graduated from Germantown Friends School in Philadelphia in 1937. He studied physics at Dartmouth College, where he was a member of Alpha Theta chapter of Theta Chi fraternity, and at the University of California, Berkeley. He remained in school until the start of World War II, and joined the Manhattan Project in 1942, where he worked with Segrè, both at Berkeley and in Los Alamos, New Mexico. He married Beatrice Babette Copper (d. 1988) in 1943, with whom he had four children.

In 1946, after the war, Chamberlain continued with his doctoral studies at the University of Chicago under physicist Enrico Fermi. Fermi acted as an important guide and mentor for Chamberlain, encouraging him to leave behind theoretical physics for experimental physics, for which Chamberlain had a particular aptitude. Chamberlain received his PhD from the University of Chicago in 1949.

In 1948, having completed his experimental work, Chamberlain returned to Berkeley as a member of its faculty. There he, Segrè, and other physicists investigated proton-proton scattering. In 1955, a series of proton scattering experiments at Berkeley's Bevatron led to the discovery of the anti-proton, a particle like a proton but negatively charged. Chamberlain's later research work included the time projection chamber (TPC), and work at the Stanford Linear Accelerator Center (SLAC).

Chamberlain was politically active on issues of peace and social justice, and outspoken against the Vietnam War. He was a member of Scientists for Sakharov, Orlov, and Shcharansky, three physicists of the former Soviet Union imprisoned for their political beliefs. In the 1980s, he helped found the nuclear freeze movement. In 2003 he was one of 22 Nobel Laureates who signed the Humanist Manifesto.

After the death of his first wife in 1988, Chamberlain married artist June Steingart Greenfield, who died in 1991. His third wife, Senta Pugh-Chamberlain (née Gaiser) was the widow of physicist Howell Pugh.

Chamberlain was diagnosed with Parkinson's disease in 1985, and retired from teaching in 1989. He died of complications from the disease on February 28, 2006, in Berkeley at the age of 85. He was survived by his third wife, his four children from his first marriage, and two step-daughters from his third marriage.

Chamberlain plays a central role in Jacob M. Appel's Sherwood Anderson Award-winning short story, "Measures of Sorrow".

== Bibliography ==
- Chamberlain, Owen; Segre, Emilio; Wiegand, Clyde; Ypsilantis, Thomas, (October 1955). Observation of Antiprotons, Radiation Laboratory University of California predecessor to the Ernest Orlando Lawrence Berkeley National Laboratory (LBNL), United States Atomic Energy Commission predecessor to the U.S. Department of Energy.
- Chamberlain, Owen; Segre, Emilio; Wiegand, Clyde, (November 1955). Antiprotons, Radiation Laboratory University of California predecessor to the Ernest Orlando Lawrence Berkeley National Laboratory (LBNL), United States Atomic Energy Commission predecessor to the U.S. Department of Energy.
- Chamberlain, Owen; Keller, Donald V.; Mermond, Ronald; Segre, Emilio; Steiner, Herbert M.; Ypsilantis, Tom, (July 1957). Experiments on Antiprotons: Antiproton-Nucleon Cross Sections, Radiation Laboratory University of California predecessor to the Ernest Orlando Lawrence Berkeley National Laboratory (LBNL), United States Atomic Energy Commission predecessor to the U.S. Department of Energy.
- Chamberlain, O, (December 1959). The Early Antiproton Work (Nobel Lecture), Radiation Laboratory University of California predecessor to the Ernest Orlando Lawrence Berkeley National Laboratory (LBNL), United States Atomic Energy Commission predecessor to the U.S. Department of Energy.
- Chamberlain, O, (September 1984). Personal History of Nucleon Polarization Experiments, Lawrence Berkeley Laboratory (LBL) predecessor to the Ernest Orlando Lawrence Berkeley National Laboratory (LBNL), U.S. Department of Energy.
