= Harold A. Fidler =

Associate Director of the Lawrence Radiation Laboratory

Harold Alvin Fidler
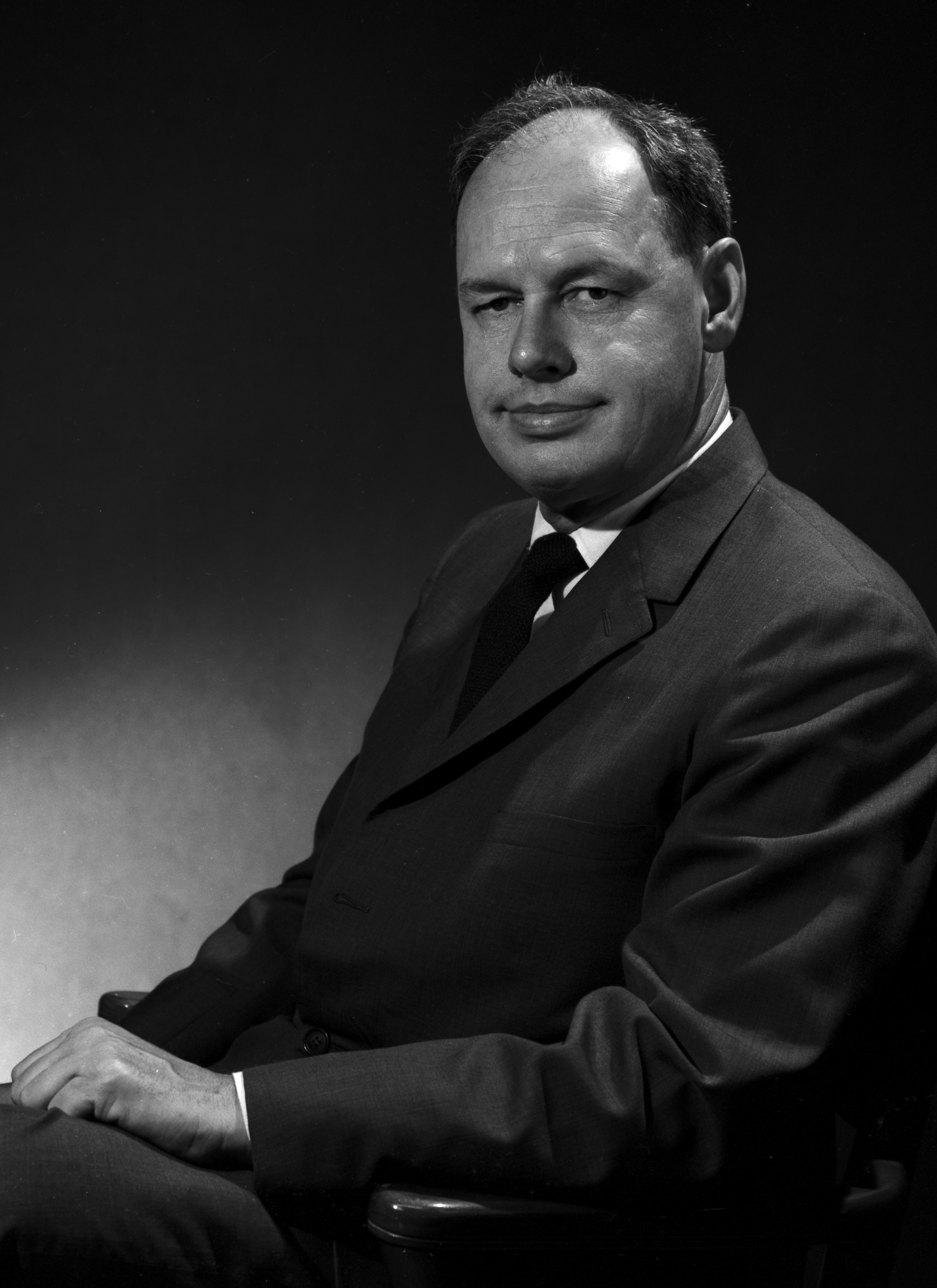
- Fidler in 1961
- Born: August 2, 1910; Philadelphia, Pennsylvania
- Died: April 2, 2004 (aged 93); Oakland, California
- Military career
- Allegiance: United States
- Branch: United States Army Corps of Engineers
- Service years: 1942–1945
- Rank: Major
- Unit: Manhattan District
- Commands: California Area
- Conflicts: World War II
- Awards: Legion of Merit
- Scientific career
- Education: Drexel Institute of Technology; Massachusetts Institute of Technology
- Fields: Civil engineering
- Workplaces: United States Army Corps of Engineers; Atomic Energy Commission; Berkeley Radiation Laboratory
- Thesis: Investigation of stress-strain relationships of granular soils by a new cylindrical compression apparatus (1940)

Harold Alvin Fidler (August 2, 1910 – April 2, 2004) was the Associate Director of the Lawrence Radiation Laboratory from 1958 to 1974. During World War II he served as the Manhattan Project's California Area Engineer, where he worked with Ernest O. Lawrence's Berkeley Radiation Laboratory, which was developing calutrons for electromagnetic isotope separation. As such, he was responsible for the administration of contracts between the Army and the University of California.

== Early life ==
Harold Alvin Fidler was born in Philadelphia, Pennsylvania, on August 2, 1910. He studied civil engineering, earning a Bachelor of Science degree from Drexel Institute of Technology in 1932. He then went to Massachusetts Institute of Technology (MIT), from which he earned a Master of Science in civil engineering in 1934, writing his thesis on "A precise determination of stresses in bridges due to wind loads", and a Doctor of Science in civil engineering in 1940, writing his thesis on "Investigation of stress-strain relationships of granular soils by a new cylindrical compression apparatus". While he was at MIT, he joined the Reserve Officers' Training Corps (ROTC). He also met Lillian E. Saari. They were married in 1939, and had three children, Marjorie, Donald and Richard.

== Manhattan Project ==
After his graduation from MIT, he became Engineer-in-charge of the Foundation Investigation Section at the United States Army Corps of Engineers in Ithaca, New York. In this capacity, he worked as a civilian, but in 1942, with the United States at war during World War II, was called to active duty as a first lieutenant in the Corps of Engineers. He was one of the first officers assigned to the Manhattan District. He was posted to California, where Ernest Lawrence was developing an electromagnetic isotope separation process using devices known as calutrons at the Berkeley Radiation Laboratory. Major Thomas T. Crenshaw, Jr., became California Area Engineer in August 1942, with Fidler as his assistant. Crenshaw established his office in the Donner Laboratory at the University of California.

Crenshaw soon left, and Fidler replaced him as California Area Engineer. The Army formally took over the contracts with the University of California from the Office of Scientific Research and Development (OSRD) on May 1, 1943, and it became Fidler's task to administer them. He worked closely with Kenneth Priestly, the Radiation Laboratory's business manager, and Robert M. Underbill, the secretary and treasurer of the University Board of Regents. Fidler worked to expedite the procurement and delivery of materials, particularly those that were scarce and in short supply. For security reasons, he wore civilian clothes rather than a uniform. Among his duties was to keep the University's President, Robert Gordon Sproul informed of the physical needs of the Manhattan Project.

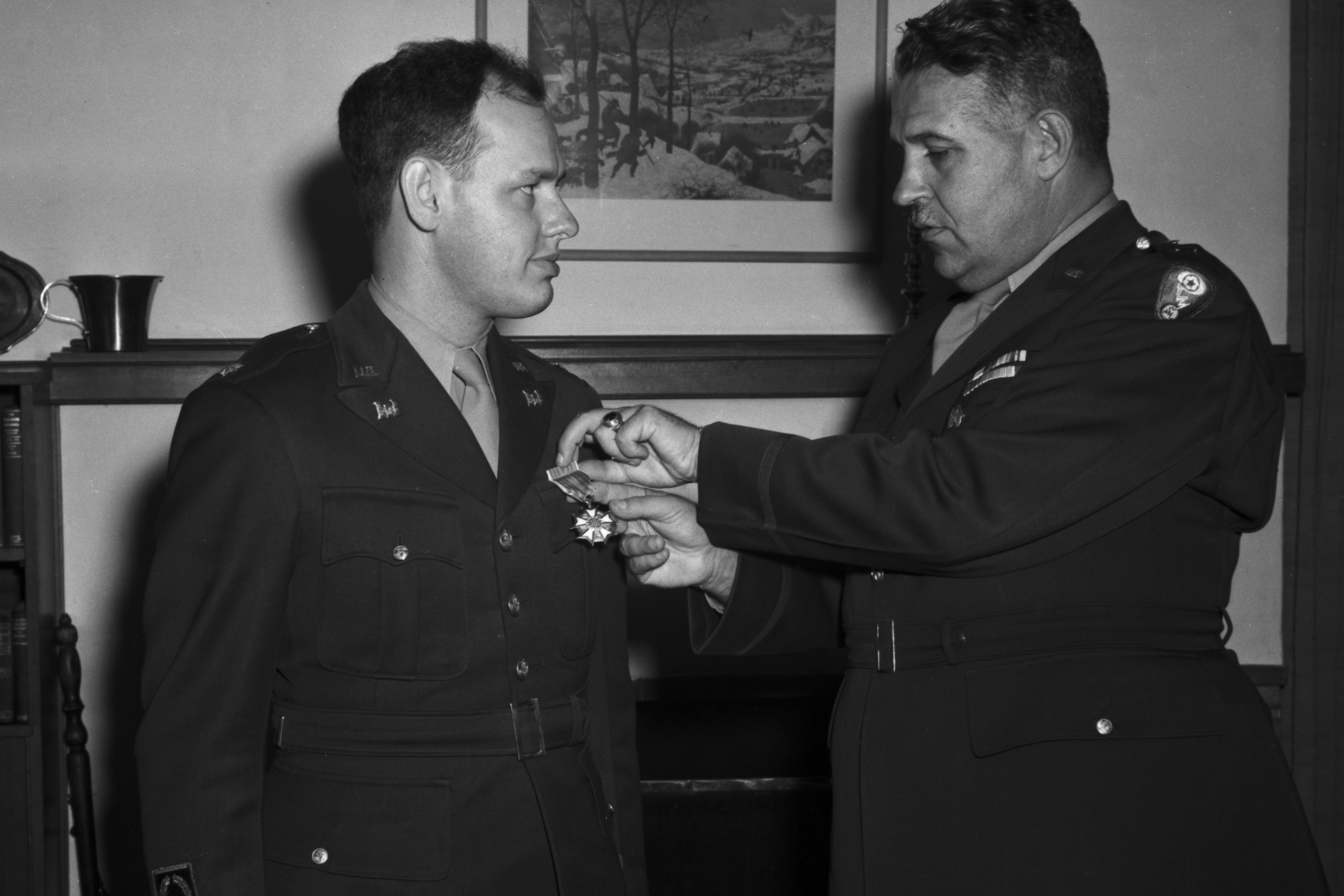
Fidler receiving the Legion of Merit from General Groves in 1945

Fidler also submitted regular reports on the activity of the Radiation Laboratory to the director of the Manhattan Project, Brigadier General Leslie Groves, and briefed him, on his visits to Berkeley, which were made about once a month between October 1942 and November 1943. As part of his role in coordinating the electromagnetic process, Fidler occasionally visited Chicago, which was more convenient for contractors like Westinghouse, General Electric, and Allis-Chalmers; Boston, where the offices of Stone & Webster, the main engineering contractor were located; and the production facilities at the Clinton Engineer Works in Oak Ridge, Tennessee. He attained the rank of major. After World War II ended in August 1945, Fidler was transferred to Tennessee, where he worked on the declassification of Manhattan Project documents. He was awarded the Legion of Merit for his work on the Manhattan Project, which was presented by Groves at a ceremony at Lawrence's home on October 21, 1945.

== Later life ==
Fidler left the Army, but continued to work on declassification in Washington, D.C., for the Atomic Energy Commission, which replaced the Manhattan Project on January 1, 1947. In 1949, he returned to Berkeley as the Atomic Energy Commission's Area Manager on the West Coast. In this capacity he was responsible for research activities on the West Coast, and was involved in the selection of the site for the Lawrence Livermore Laboratory, the Atomic Energy Commission's second weapons laboratory.

On December 1, 1958, at the request of Ernest Lawrence, Fidler joined the Lawrence Berkeley Laboratory as Associate Director. He remained in the role until 1974, when he and the director, Edwin McMillan, both retired. He also served on the Atomic Energy Commission's Management Advisory Committee from 1962 to 1972. He died at his Piedmont Gardens Retirement Community home in Oakland, California, on April 2, 2004. He was survived by his three children, his wife having predeceased him in 1991.
