= Calutron Girls =

Women working on the Manhattan Project

Calutron Girls photographed by Ed Westcott at their calutron control panels at Y-12

The Calutron Girls were a group of young women—mostly high school graduates—who had joined the Manhattan Project at the Y-12 National Security Complex located at Oak Ridge, Tennessee, from 1943 to 1945. Although they were not allowed to know at the time, they were monitoring dials and watching meters for calutrons, mass spectrometers adapted for separation of uranium isotopes for the development of nuclear weapons for use during World War II. The enriched uranium was used to make the "Little Boy" atomic bomb for the Hiroshima nuclear bombing on August 6, 1945.

== Background ==
During World War II, the United States established the Manhattan Project to develop nuclear weapons. This required uranium-235 (U^{235}), the fissionable isotope of uranium. However, the vast majority of uranium mined from the ground is uranium-238, while only 0.7% is U^{235}. Scientists developed several processes for separating the isotopes of uranium, including electromagnetic separation and gaseous diffusion.

The Y-12 factory was built in Oak Ridge, Tennessee, to house 1,152 calutrons, a machine used for isotope separation. The word "calutron" is a portmanteau of California University Cyclotron. Calutrons, a variation on mass spectrometers, work by combining uranium with chlorine to make uranium tetrachloride, which is then ionized and put in a vacuum chamber with a magnetic field. When the charged particles move through the magnetic field, they move in a curve, the radius of which is proportional to the mass of the particles. The two isotopes differ in mass by about 1% and can thus be separated.

The operation was relatively simple, but it required people to constantly monitor the calutrons. Due to a labor shortage, there were not enough scientists to operate all of them, and many young men were fighting in the war overseas, so the government recruited farm girls to operate the calutrons instead. Local women were recruited because they were readily available, accustomed to hard work and were expected not to ask excessive questions and to be loyal and docile.

== Recruitment and training ==
The Tennessee Eastman Company, which ran the Y-12 site, recruited around 10,000 local women between 1943 and 1945 to operate the calutrons. They proposed to train operators with only a high school education, and they used a large local advertising campaign to recruit workers. One ad read, "When you're a grandmother you'll brag about working at Tennessee Eastman". Several workers heard about the jobs from friends. Reasons for applying included needing the money, having few other employment opportunities, youthful wanderlust, and wanting to help the war effort. Training lasted three weeks.

== Life at work ==
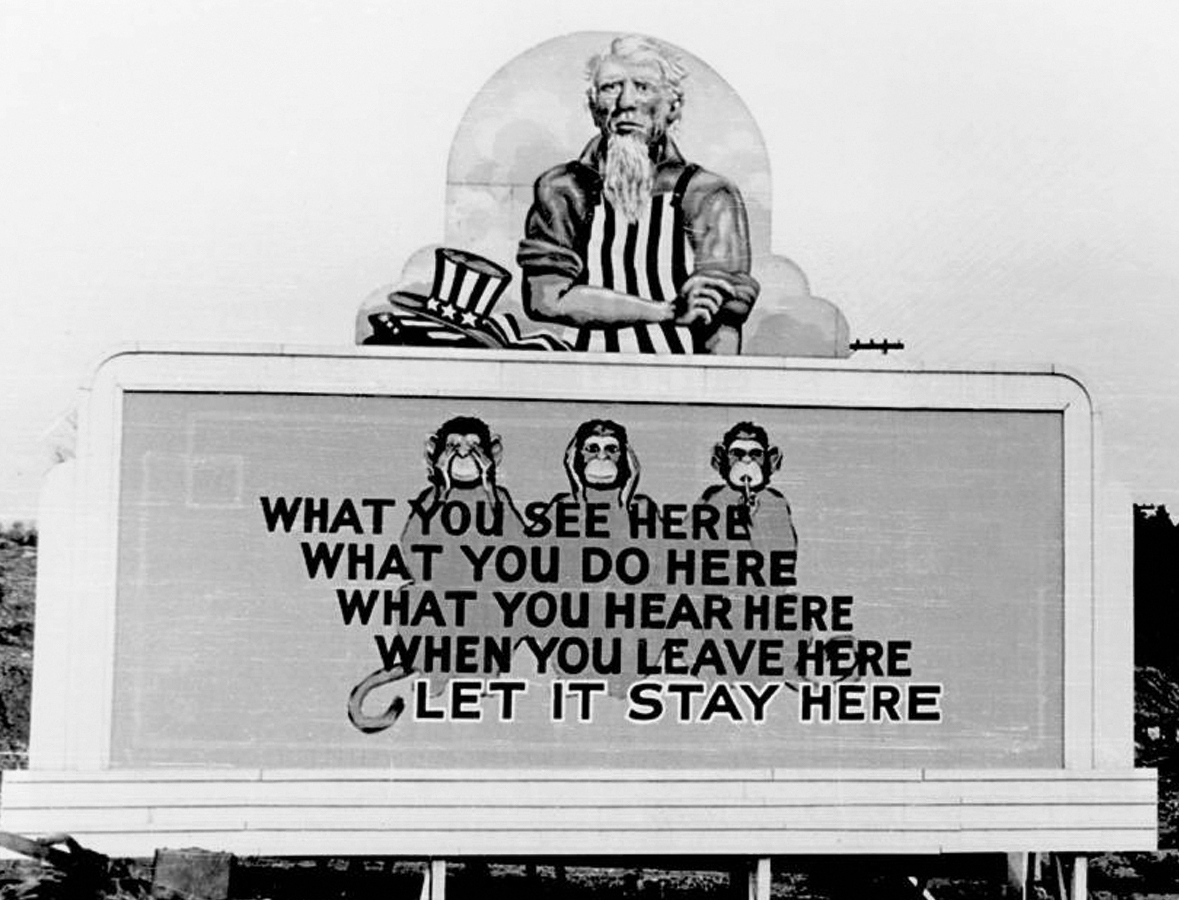
A billboard at Oak Ridge encouraging secrecy among workers

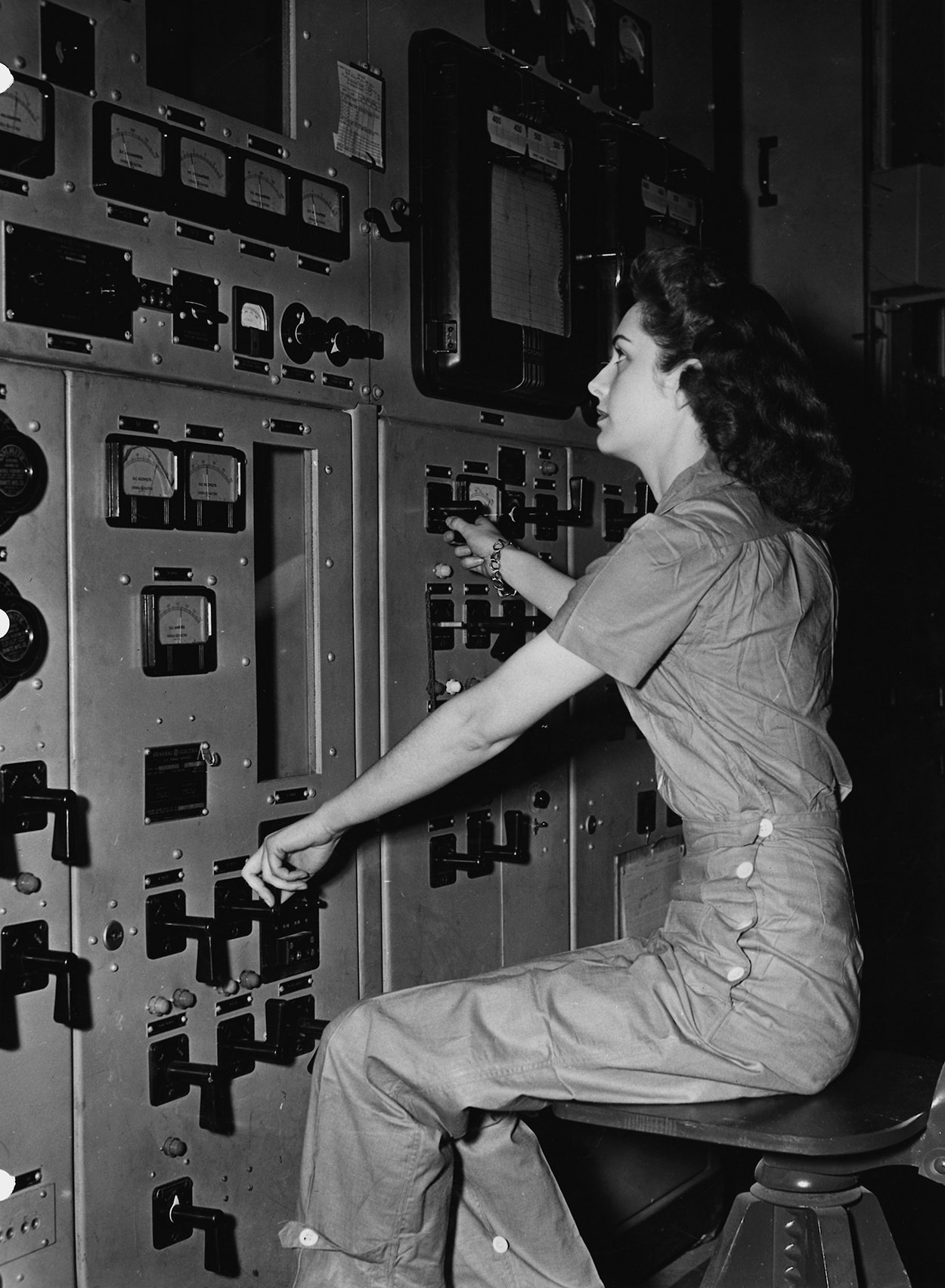
A calutron operator

Secrecy and confidentiality were a strict requirement of their employment. According to Gladys Owens, who was one of the Calutron Girls, a manager at the facility once told them: "We can train you how to do what is needed, but cannot tell you what you are doing. I can only tell you that if our enemies beat us to it, God have mercy on us!" Testimonies said women who talked about what they were doing disappeared. One young woman who disappeared was said to have "died from drinking some poison moonshine". If they were too nosy about what they were working on, they were replaced. Cars going in and out were searched, and letters were opened and read.

The workers sat on high stools for 8-hour shifts, seven days per week, monitoring gauges and adjusting knobs to keep the needles where they were supposed to be and recording readings. The knobs were labeled with cryptic letters. The women did not know what the letters stood for, but they learned rules such as "if you got your M voltage up and your G voltage up, then Product would hit the birdcage in the E box at the top of the unit and if that happened, you'd get the Q and R you wanted". They had to make sure the machine remained at the correct temperature; if it got too hot, they used liquid nitrogen to cool it down. If the needles reached a point where they could not control them, they had to call someone else to come help.

Former Calutron Girl Wynona Arrington Butner said, "We all wore little fountain-pen-sized dosimeters. Part of signing out of the plant was to check the amount of radiation that you had absorbed every day." Civilian workers paid $2.50 per month (single) or $5.00 per month (family) for medical insurance.

Another calutron installation at a University of California at Berkeley laboratory was led by physicist Ernest O. Lawrence and operated by trained professional physicists. As the Y-12 calutron facility at Oak Ridge became operational, Lawrence desired that it be also run by physicists. Because of the labor shortage during WWII, the staffing went to farm girls instead. As each new unit was completed by Stone & Webster, Lawrence and a team of Berkeley scientists operated it to eliminate any bugs, then transferred it to Tennessee Eastman; this gave the scientists first-hand knowledge regarding any needed improvements. Kenneth Nichols compared production data for units and pointed out to Lawrence that the young ”hillbilly” girl operators were outproducing his scientists. Lawrence claimed that his men were experimenting with ways to improve operations. But when he agreed to a weeklong “production race,” he lost. Nichols wrote that “the girls won because they were trained like soldiers “to do or not to do – not to reason why”. But the scientists could not refrain from time-consuming investigations of even minor fluctuations of the dials. This little contest provided a big boost in morale for the Tennessee Eastman workers and supervisors.

Some Calutron Girls had more of a sense of what they were working on than others. Butner, who had some training in chemistry, said she and others with a similar background knew they were producing "the Product". They guessed it was somewhere near the bottom of the periodic table. Willie Baker, on the other hand, said, "Even when somebody let it slip that we were building a bomb, I didn’t know what they meant. I was just a country girl. I had no understanding of what an atomic bomb was."

== Bombing and aftermath ==
Over two years, the calutrons at Y-12 had produced about 140 lb (64 kg) of U^{235}. This was enough to make the first atomic bomb (enough uranium for a second Little Boy would have been available by December 1945). On August 6, 1945, when the US dropped the first bomb, "Little Boy," on Hiroshima, Japan, the Calutron Girls were finally told what they had been working on. Some women were working and others were in their dorm rooms when someone came and told them that an atomic bomb had been dropped on Japan, and everyone there had played a part in making it.

Several Calutron Girls had mixed feelings about their part in the bomb. Ruth Huddleston said she was really happy at the time, because her boyfriend was stationed in Germany, and this would bring him back. It bothered her that she had a part in killing so many people, but she accepted that "if the bomb hadn’t been dropped, then probably more people would have been killed. ... But even today, if I think too much about it, it bothers me." Butner had a similar experience: at the time, she was happy that the war was over and people she knew in the service could come home, but over time, she began to question whether it was the right thing to do.

As of 2020, only a few elderly Calutron Girls remained. Some, such as Huddleston, regularly shared their stories with the public, often alongside Oak Ridge historian Ray Smith. The women are the subject of the nonfiction book The Girls of Atomic City by Denise Kiernan and the novel The Atomic City Girls by Janet Beard.

== See also ==
- Clinton Engineer Works
- Rosie the Riveter
- Women in World War II
