= Calutron =

Mass spectrometer

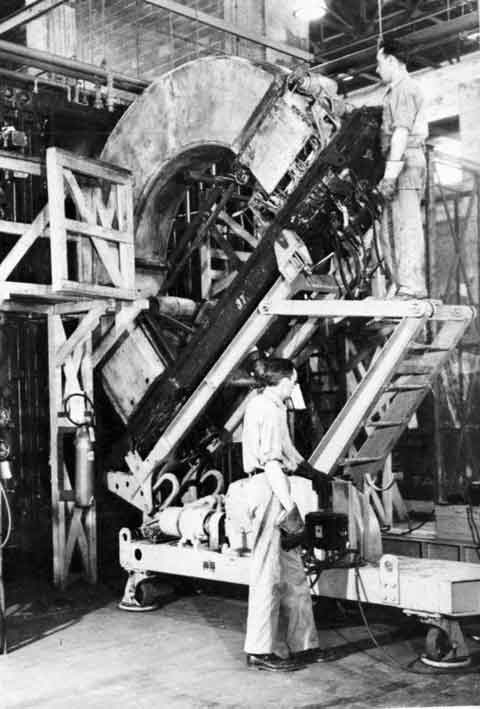
An Alpha calutron tank removed from the magnet for recovery of uranium-235

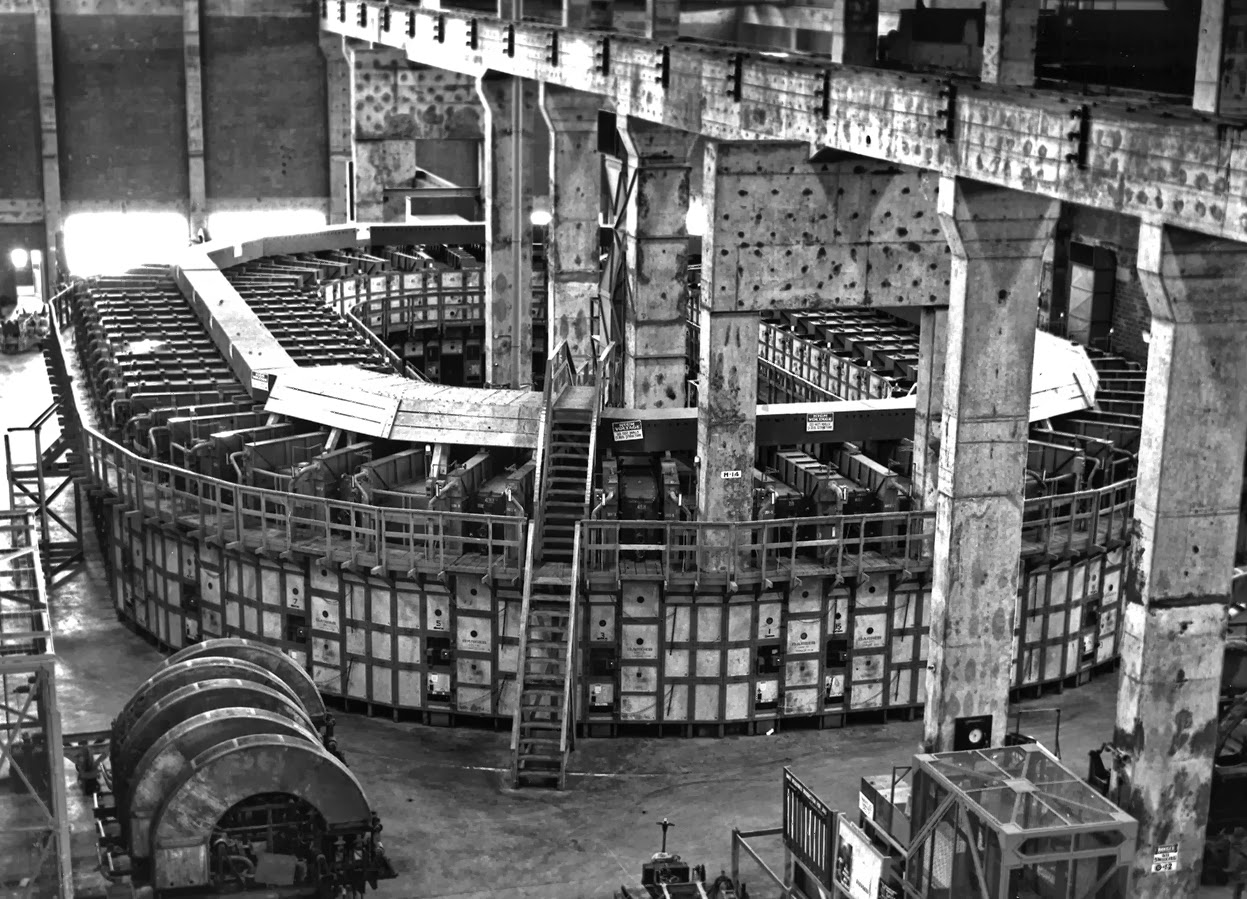
Alpha I magnet, called the "Racetrack". The calutrons are located around the ring.

A calutron is a mass spectrometer originally designed and used for separating the isotopes of uranium. It was developed by Ernest Lawrence during the Manhattan Project and was based on his earlier invention, the cyclotron. Its name was derived from California University Cyclotron, in tribute to Lawrence's institution, the University of California, where it was invented. Calutrons were used in the industrial-scale Y-12 uranium enrichment plant at the Clinton Engineer Works in Oak Ridge, Tennessee. The enriched uranium produced was used in the Little Boy atomic bomb that was detonated over Hiroshima on 6 August 1945.

The calutron is a type of sector mass spectrometer, an instrument in which a sample is ionized and then accelerated by electric fields and deflected by magnetic fields. The ions ultimately collide with a plate and produce a measurable electric current. Since the ions of the different isotopes have the same electric charge but different masses, the heavier isotopes are deflected less by the magnetic field, causing the beam of particles to separate into several beams by mass, striking the plate at different locations. The mass of the ions can be calculated according to the strength of the field and the charge of the ions. During World War II, calutrons were developed to use this principle to obtain substantial quantities of high-purity uranium-235, by taking advantage of the small mass difference between uranium isotopes.

Electromagnetic separation for uranium enrichment was abandoned in the post-war period in favor of the more complicated, but more efficient, gaseous diffusion method. Although most of the calutrons of the Manhattan Project were dismantled at the end of the war, some remained in use to produce isotopically enriched samples of naturally occurring elements for military, scientific and medical purposes.

== Origins ==
News of the discovery of nuclear fission by German chemists Otto Hahn and Fritz Strassmann in 1938, and its theoretical explanation by Lise Meitner and Otto Frisch, was brought to the United States by Niels Bohr. Based on his liquid drop model of the nucleus, he theorized that it was the uranium-235 isotope and not the more abundant uranium-238 that was primarily responsible for fission with thermal neutrons. To verify this Alfred O. C. Nier at the University of Minnesota used a mass spectrometer to create a microscopic amount of enriched uranium-235 in April 1940. John R. Dunning, Aristid von Grosse and Eugene T. Booth were then able to confirm that Bohr was correct. Leo Szilard and Walter Zinn soon confirmed that more than one neutron was released per fission, which made it almost certain that a nuclear chain reaction could be initiated, and therefore that the development of an atomic bomb was a theoretical possibility. There were fears that a German atomic bomb project would develop one first, especially among scientists who were refugees from Nazi Germany and other fascist countries.

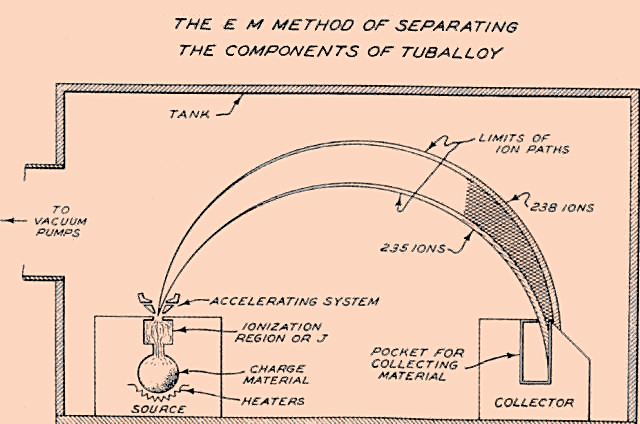
Diagram of uranium isotope separation in the calutron

At the University of Birmingham in Britain, the Australian physicist Mark Oliphant assigned two refugee physicists—Otto Frisch and Rudolf Peierls—the task of investigating the feasibility of an atomic bomb, ironically because their status as enemy aliens precluded their working on secret projects like radar. Their March 1940 Frisch–Peierls memorandum indicated that the critical mass of uranium-235 was within an order of magnitude of 10 kg, which was small enough to be carried by a bomber of the day. The British Maud Committee then unanimously recommended pursuing the development of an atomic bomb. Britain had offered to give the United States access to its scientific research, so the Tizard Mission's John Cockcroft briefed American scientists on British developments. He discovered that the American project was smaller than the British, and not as far advanced.

A disappointed Oliphant flew to the United States to speak to the American scientists. These included Ernest Lawrence at the University of California's Radiation Laboratory in Berkeley. The two men had met before the war, and were friends. Lawrence was sufficiently impressed to commence his own research into uranium. Uranium-235 makes up only about 0.72% of natural uranium, so the separation factor of any uranium enrichment process needs to be higher than 125 to produce 90% uranium-235 from natural uranium. The Maud Committee had recommended that this be done by a process of gaseous diffusion, but Oliphant had pioneered another technique in 1934: electromagnetic separation. This was the process that Nier had used.

The principle of electromagnetic separation is that charged ions are deflected by a magnetic field, and lighter ones are deflected more than heavy ones. The reason the Maud Committee, and later its American counterpart, the S-1 Section of the Office of Scientific Research and Development (OSRD), had passed over the electromagnetic method was that while the mass spectrometer was capable of separating isotopes, it produced very low yields. The reason for this was the so-called space charge limitation. Positive ions have positive charge, so they tend to repel each other, which causes the beam to scatter. Drawing on his experience with the precise control of charged-particle beams from his work with his invention, the cyclotron, Lawrence suspected that the air molecules in the vacuum chamber would neutralize the ions, and create a focused beam. Oliphant inspired Lawrence to convert his old 37-inch (94 cm) cyclotron into a giant mass spectrometer for isotope separation.

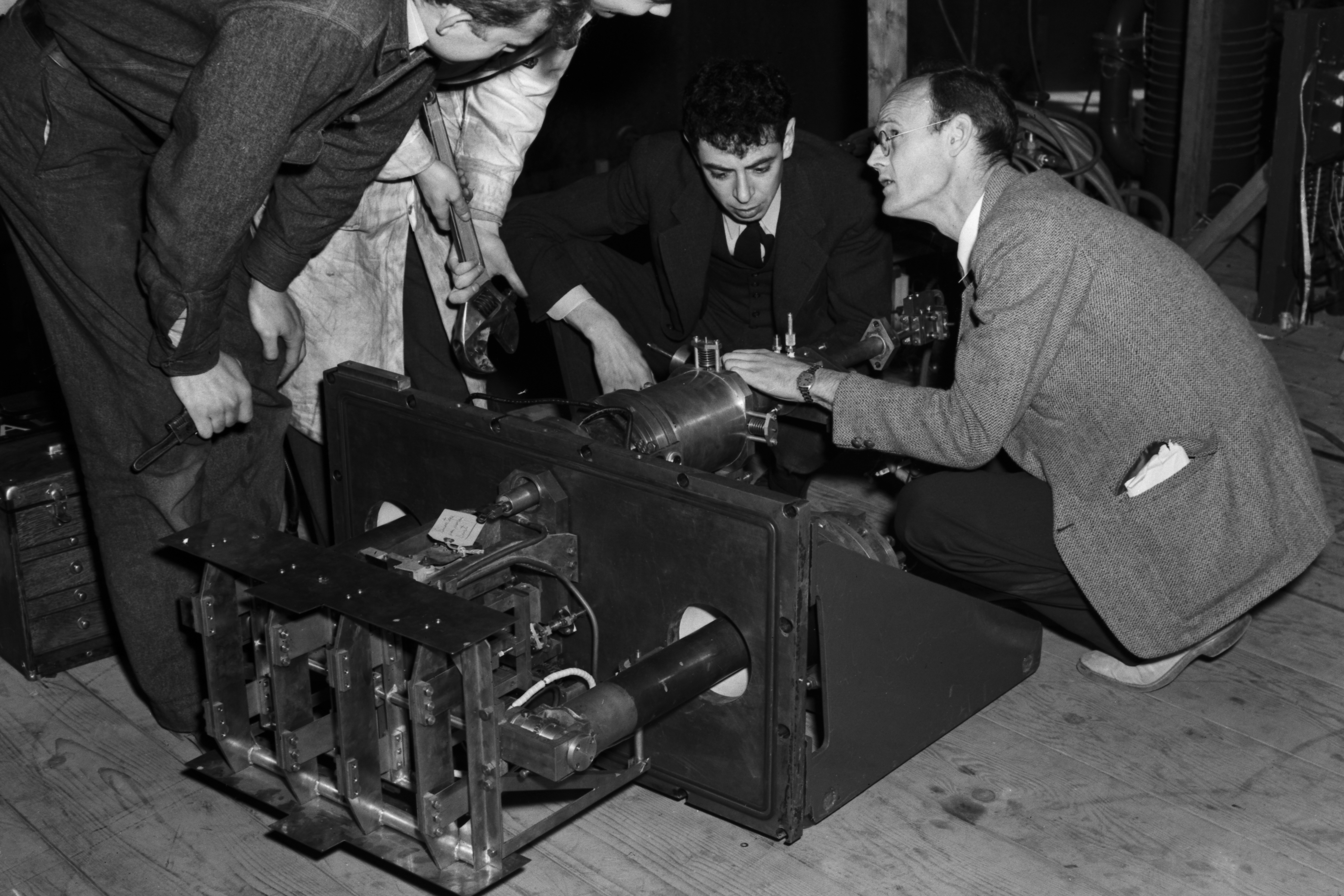
Frank Oppenheimer (center right) and Robert Thornton (right) examine the 4-source emitter for the improved Alpha calutron.

The 37-inch cyclotron at Berkeley was dismantled on 24 November 1941, and its magnet used to create the first calutron. Its name came from California University and cyclotron. The work was initially funded by the Radiation Laboratory from its own resources, with a $5,000 grant from the Research Corporation. In December Lawrence received a $400,000 grant from the S-1 Uranium Committee. The calutron consisted of an ion source, in the form of a box with a slit in it and hot filaments inside. Uranium tetrachloride was ionized by the filament, and then passed through a 0.04-by-2-inch (1.0 by 50.8 mm) slot into a vacuum chamber. The magnet was then used to deflect the ion beam by 180°. The enriched and depleted beams went into collectors.

When the calutron was first operated on 2 December 1941, just days before the Japanese attack on Pearl Harbor brought the United States into World War II, a uranium beam intensity of 5 microamperes (μA) was received by the collector. Lawrence's hunch about the effect of the air molecules in the vacuum chamber was confirmed. A nine-hour run on 14 January 1942 with a 50 μA beam produced 18 micrograms (μg) of uranium enriched to 25% uranium-235, about ten times as much as Nier had produced. By February, improvements in the technique allowed it to generate a 1,400 μA beam. That month, 75 μg samples enriched to 30% were shipped to the British and the Metallurgical Laboratory in Chicago.

Other researchers also investigated electromagnetic isotope separation. At Princeton University, a group led by Henry D. Smyth and Robert R. Wilson developed a device known as an isotron. Using a klystron, they were able to separate isotopes using high-voltage electricity rather than magnetism. Work continued until February 1943, when, in view of the greater success of the calutron, work was discontinued and the team was transferred to other duties. At Cornell University a group under Lloyd P. Smith that included William E. Parkins, and A. Theodore Forrester devised a radial magnetic separator. They were surprised that their beams were more precise than expected, and, like Lawrence, deduced that it was a result of stabilization of the beam by air in the vacuum chamber. In February 1942, their team was consolidated with Lawrence's in Berkeley.

== Research ==
While the process had been demonstrated to work, considerable effort was still required before a prototype could be tested in the field. Lawrence assembled a team of physicists to tackle the problems, including David Bohm, Edward Condon, Donald Cooksey, A. Theodore Forrester, Irving Langmuir, Kenneth Ross MacKenzie, Frank Oppenheimer, J. Robert Oppenheimer, William E. Parkins, Bernard Peters and Joseph Slepian. In November 1943 they were joined by a British Mission headed by Oliphant that included fellow Australian physicists Harrie Massey and Eric Burhop, and British physicists such as Joan Curran and Thomas Allibone.

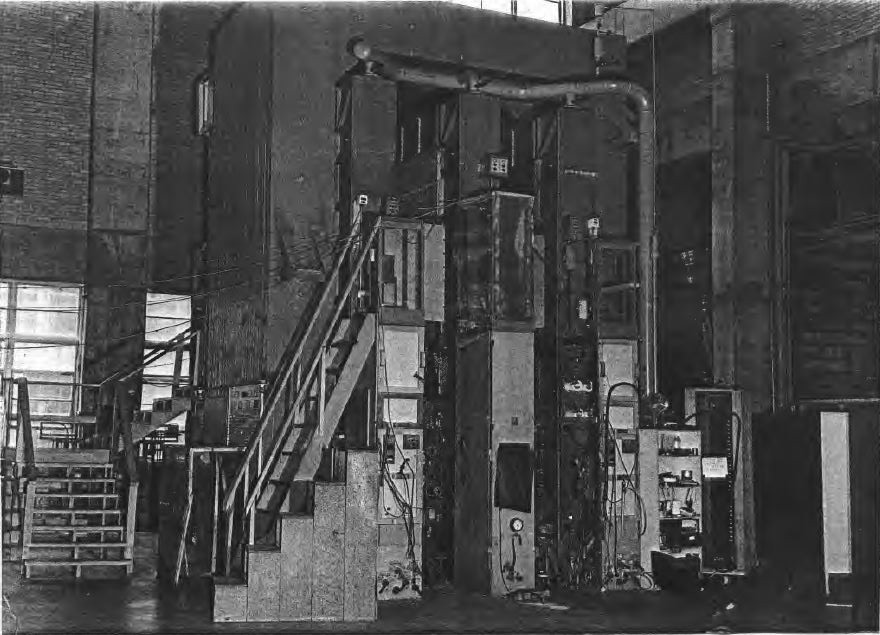
The XAX development unit at Oak Ridge was used for research, development and training.

Lawrence had a large cyclotron under construction at Berkeley, one with a 184-inch (470 cm) magnet. This was converted into a calutron that was switched on for the first time on 26 May 1942. Like the 37-inch version, it looked like a giant C when viewed from above. The operator sat in the open end, whence the temperature could be regulated, the position of the electrodes adjusted, and even components replaced through an airlock while it was running. The new, more powerful calutron was not used to produce enriched uranium, but for experiments with multiple ion sources. This meant having more collectors, but it multiplied the throughput.

The problem was that the beams interfered with each other, producing a series of oscillations called hash. An arrangement was devised that minimized the interference, resulting in reasonably good beams being produced, in September 1942. Robert Oppenheimer and Stan Frankel invented the magnetic shim, a device used to adjust the homogeneity of a magnetic field. These were sheets of iron about 3 feet (1 m) in width that were bolted to the top and bottom of the vacuum tank. The effect of the shims was to slightly increase the magnetic field in such a way as to help focus the ion beam. Work would continue on the shims through 1943. The main calutron patents were Methods of and apparatus for separating materials (Lawrence), Magnetic shims (Oppenheimer and Frankel), and Calutron system (Lawrence).

Burhop and Bohm later studied the characteristics of electric discharges in magnetic fields, today known as Bohm diffusion. Their papers on the properties of plasmas under magnetic containment would find usage in the post-war world in research into controlled nuclear fusion. Other technical problems were more mundane but no less important. Although the beams had low intensity, they could, over many hours of operation, still melt the collectors. A water cooling system was therefore added to the collectors and the tank liner. Procedures were developed for cleaning the "gunk" that condensed inside the vacuum tank. A particular problem was blockage of the slits by "crud", which caused the ion beams to lose focus, or stop entirely.

The chemists had to find a way of producing quantities of uranium tetrachloride (UCl_{4}) from uranium oxide. (Nier had used uranium bromide.) Initially, they produced it by using hydrogen to reduce uranium trioxide (UO_{3}) to uranium dioxide (UO_{2}), which was then reacted with carbon tetrachloride (CCl_{4}) to produce uranium tetrachloride. Charles A. Kraus proposed a better method for large-scale production that involved reacting the uranium oxide with carbon tetrachloride at high temperature and pressure. This produced uranium pentachloride (UCl_{5}) and phosgene (COCl_{2}). While nowhere near as volatile as the uranium hexafluoride used by the gaseous diffusion process, uranium tetrachloride is hygroscopic, so work with it had to be undertaken in gloveboxes that were kept dry with phosphorus pentoxide (P_{4}O_{10}). The presence of phosgene, a lethal gas responsible for 85,000 deaths as a chemical weapon during World War I, required that the chemists wear gas masks when handling it.

Of the $19.6 million spent on research and development of the electromagnetic process, $18 million (92 percent) was spent at the Radiation Laboratory in Berkeley, and further work conducted at Brown University, Johns Hopkins University and Purdue University, and by the Tennessee Eastman corporation. During 1943, the emphasis shifted from research to development, engineering, and the training of workers to operate the production facilities at the Clinton Engineer Works in Oak Ridge, Tennessee. By the middle of 1944, there were nearly 1,200 people working at the Radiation Laboratory.

== Design ==
Much of the great progress on the electromagnetic process can be attributed to Lawrence's leadership style. His audacity, optimism and enthusiasm were contagious. His staff put in long hours, and University of California administrators sliced through red tape despite not knowing what the project was about. Government officials began to view the development of atomic bombs in time to affect the outcome of the war as a genuine possibility. Vannevar Bush, the director of the OSRD, which was overseeing the project, visited Berkeley in February 1942, and found the atmosphere there "stimulating" and "refreshing". On 9 March 1942, he reported to the president, Franklin D. Roosevelt, that it might be possible to produce enough material for a bomb by mid-1943, based on new estimates from Robert Oppenheimer that the critical mass of a sphere of pure uranium-235 was between 2.0 and 2.5 kilograms.

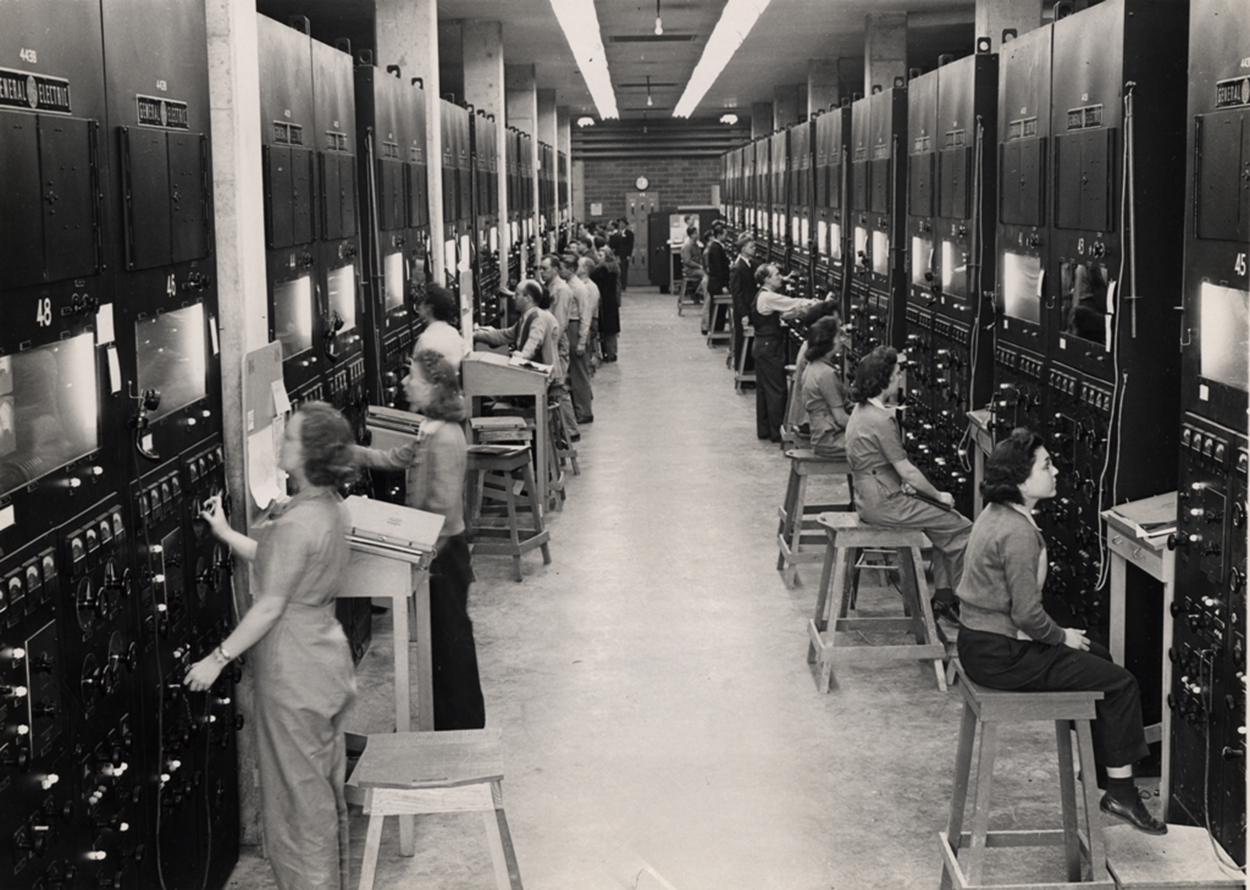
Control panels and operators for calutrons at the Oak Ridge Y-12 Plant. The operators, mostly women, worked in shifts covering 24 hours a day.

The experiments with the 184-inch magnet led to the construction of a prototype calutron called the XA. It contained a rectangular, three-coil magnet with a horizontal field in which the calutron tanks could stand side by side, with four vacuum tanks, each with a double source. At the 25 June 1942 meeting of the S-1 Executive Committee, which had superseded the S-1 Uranium Committee on 19 June, there was a proposal to build the electromagnetic plant at Oak Ridge, where the other Manhattan Project uranium separation facilities would be located, for reasons of economy and security. Lawrence lodged an objection due to his desire to have the electromagnetic separation plant located much nearer to Berkeley. The Shasta Dam area in California remained under consideration for the electromagnetic plant until September 1942, by which time Lawrence had dropped his objection. The 25 June meeting also designated Stone & Webster as the primary contractor for the design and engineering.

The Army assumed responsibility for the Manhattan Project on 17 September 1942, with Brigadier General Leslie R. Groves, Jr., as director, although the Army did not formally take over the contracts with the University of California from the OSRD until 1 May 1943. Major Thomas T. Crenshaw, Jr., became California Area Engineer in August 1942, with Captain Harold A. Fidler, who soon replaced him, as his assistant. Crenshaw established his office in the Donner Laboratory at the University of California. In September 1942, the S-1 Executive Committee recommended that a five-tank pilot plant be built along with a 200-tank section of a production plant.

Between October 1942 and November 1943, Groves paid monthly visits to the Radiation Laboratory in Berkeley. Reports indicated that compared to the alternatives of a gaseous diffusion plant or a plutonium-producing nuclear reactor, an electromagnetic plant would take longer and require more scarce materials to build, and need more manpower and more electricity to operate. The cost of a kilogram of fissile material would therefore be much greater. On the other hand, while the alternative processes still faced considerable technical obstacles, the electromagnetic process was proven to work, and could be built in stages that would immediately start producing fissile material. Groves cancelled the pilot plant on 14 November, in favor of proceeding immediately with the production plant.

The Radiation Laboratory forwarded the preliminary designs for a production plant to Stone & Webster before the end of the year, but one important issue remained unsettled. Oppenheimer contended that weapons-grade uranium would have to be 90% pure uranium-235. Edward Lofgren and Martin Kamen thought that this could not be achieved without a second stage of enrichment. The two stages became known as Alpha and Beta. In March 1943, Groves approved the construction of five Alpha and two Beta racetracks. In September, he authorized four more Alpha racetracks, which became known as Alpha II, along with two more Beta racetracks to process their product.

== Construction ==
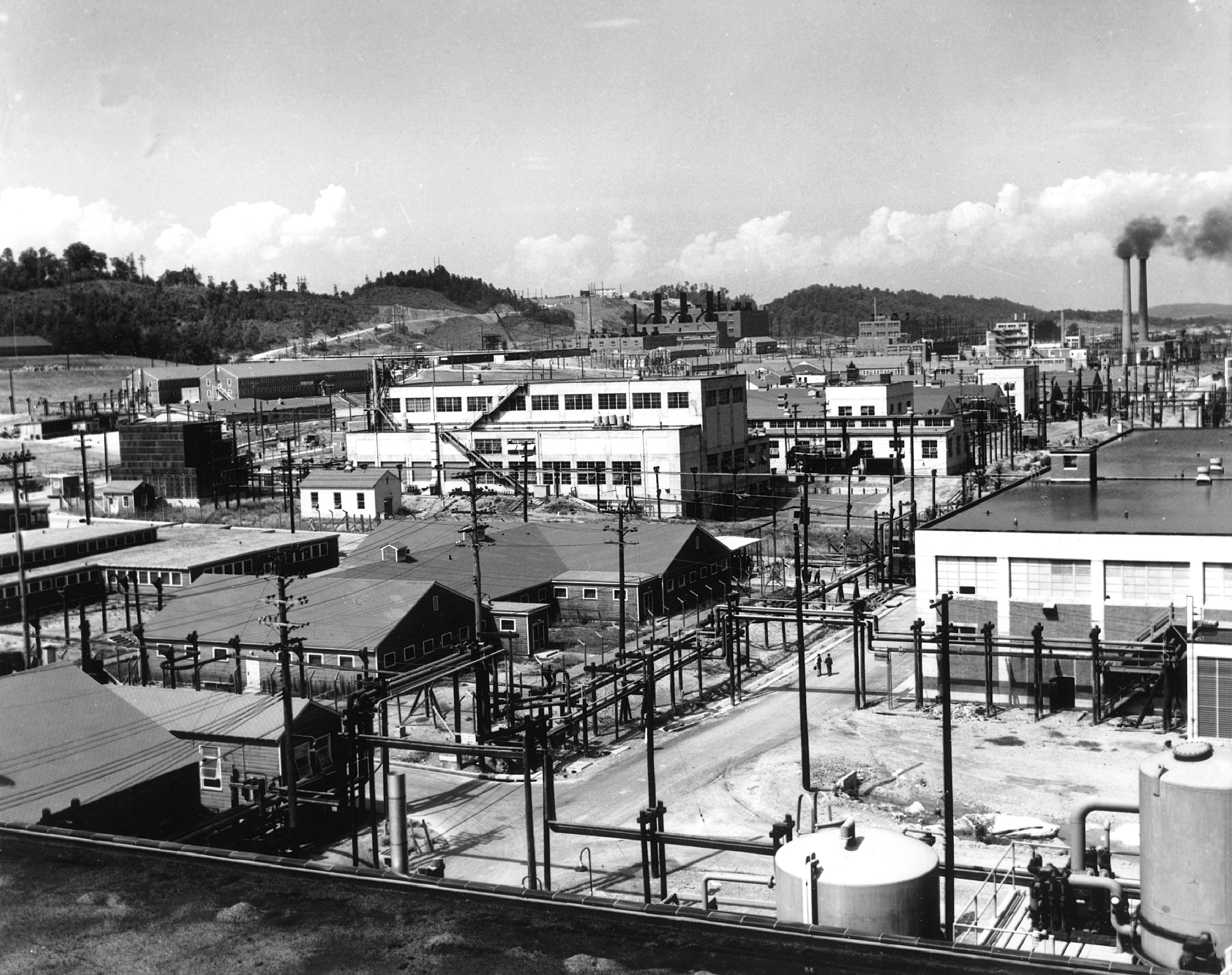
The Y-12 electromagnetic plant

Construction of the electromagnetic plant at Oak Ridge, codenamed Y-12, commenced 18 February 1943. The facility would eventually comprise nine major process buildings and 200 other structures covering almost 80 acres (32 ha) of floor space. The 825-acre (334 ha) site in Bear Creek Valley southwest of the Oak Ridge township was selected in the hope that the surrounding ridge lines might contain a major explosion or nuclear accident. Problems with the substratum required the excavation crews to perform more blasting and excavation to provide adequate foundations for the heavy machinery in the facilities.

Supplies and materials of all kinds poured in: 2,157 carloads of electrical equipment, 1,219 of heavy equipment, 5,389 of lumber, 1,407 of pipe and fittings, 1,188 of steel, 257 of valves, and 11 of welding electrodes. The racetracks required 85,000 vacuum tubes. Where possible, off-the-shelf components were used, but all too many components of the calutrons were unique. Two purchasing departments were established, one in Boston near Stone & Webster for facility equipment, and the other at Oak Ridge for construction supplies.

The Chief Engineer of the Manhattan District, Colonel James C. Marshall, and his deputy, Lieutenant Colonel Kenneth D. Nichols, discovered that the electromagnetic isotope separation process would require 5,000 short tons (4,500 tonnes) of copper, which was in desperately short supply. However, they realized that silver could be substituted, in an 11:10 ratio of copper:silver. On 3 August 1942, Nichols met with the Under Secretary of the Treasury, Daniel W. Bell, and asked for the transfer of silver bullion from the West Point Bullion Depository. Nichols later recalled the conversation:

He explained the procedure for transferring the silver and asked, "How much do you need?" I replied, "Six thousand tons." 'How many troy ounces is that?" he asked. In fact I did not know how to convert tons to troy ounces, and neither did he. A little impatient, I responded, "I don't know how many troy ounces we need but I know I need six thousand tons—that is a definite quantity. What difference does it make how we express the quantity?" He replied rather indignantly, "Young man, you may think of silver in tons, but the Treasury will always think of silver in troy ounces."

Eventually, 14,700 short tons (13,300 tonnes; 430,000,000 troy ounces) of silver were used, then worth over $600 million. Nichols had to provide a monthly accounting to the Treasury. The 1,000-troy-ounce (31 kg) silver bars were taken under guard to the Defense Plant Corporation in Carteret, New Jersey, where they were cast into cylindrical billets, and then to Phelps Dodge in Bayway, New Jersey, where they were extruded into strips 0.625 inches (15.9 mm) thick, 3 inches (7.6 cm) wide and 40 feet (12 m) long. Some 258 carloads were shipped under guard by rail to Allis-Chalmers in Milwaukee, Wisconsin, where they were wound onto magnetic coils and sealed into welded casings. Finally, they moved by unguarded flatcars to the Clinton Engineer Works. There, special procedures were instituted for handling the silver. When they had to drill holes in it, they did so over paper so that the filings could be collected. After the war, all the machinery was dismantled and cleaned and the floorboards beneath the machinery were ripped up and burned to recover minute amounts of silver. In the end, 155,645.39 troy ounces (4,841.113 kg) or less than 0.036% was lost. In May 1970, the last 67 short tons (61 tonnes; 2,000,000 troy ounces) of silver was replaced with copper and returned to the Treasury.

The XAX racetrack with two tanks and three coils was ready to train workers in August 1943. Bugs were discovered, but were not aggressively followed up. The first Alpha process building, 9201-1, was completed on 1 November 1943. When the first racetrack was started up for testing on schedule in November, the 14-ton vacuum tanks crept out of alignment by as much as 3 inches (8 cm) because of the power of the magnets and had to be fastened more securely. A more serious problem arose when the magnetic coils started shorting out. In December Groves ordered a magnet broken open, and handfuls of rust were found inside. Moisture was also a problem in its own right, as was the winding of the wire, which was too tight. Groves ordered the racetracks to be torn down and the magnets sent back to the factory to be cleaned and rewound. Rigid standards for preparation and cleanliness were instituted to prevent a recurrence of these problems.

Training for the Beta tracks shifted from the XAX to the XBX training and development racetrack in November 1943. A second Alpha I racetrack became operational in January 1944. The first Beta racetrack and the third and first Alpha racetracks, now repaired, became operational in March 1944, and the fourth Alpha racetrack in April 1944. A third building, 9201-3, contained a fifth racetrack that incorporated some modifications, and was known as Alpha I1/2. This became operational on 3 June 1944. Work on the Alpha and Beta chemistry buildings, 9202 and 9203, commenced in February 1943, and was completed in September. Work on the Beta process building, 9204-1, began in May 1943, and was ready for operation on 13 March 1944, but was not completed until September 1944.

Groves authorized Alpha II in September 1943. This consisted of two new Alpha process buildings, 9201-4 and 9201-5, another Beta, 9204-2, an extension to the Alpha chemistry building, and a new Beta chemistry building, 9206. When 9206 opened, the old Beta chemistry building, 9203, was converted into a laboratory. Work started on the new Alpha II process buildings on 2 November 1943; the first racetrack was completed in July 1944, and all four were operational by 1 October 1944. The Alpha II racetracks were configured in a linear layout rather than an oval, although they were still called racetracks. In all, there were 864 Alpha calutrons, arranged in nine racetracks of 96. There were only 36 calutrons in each Beta racetrack, for a total of 288 calutrons, although only 216 of them were ever operated.

Work on the new Beta process building commenced on 20 October 1943. Equipment installation began on 1 April 1944, and it was ready for use on 10 September 1944. A third Beta process building, 9204-3, was authorized in May 1944 to process the output of the K-25 gaseous diffusion plant. It was completed on 15 May 1945. A fourth Beta process building, 9204-4, was authorized on 2 April 1945 and was completed by 1 December 1945. A new group of Alpha chemistry buildings known as the 9207 group was commenced in June 1944, but work was halted in June 1945 before they were completed. Along with these main buildings, there were offices, workshops, warehouses and other structures. There were two steam plants for heating, and a power plant for electricity.

== Operations ==
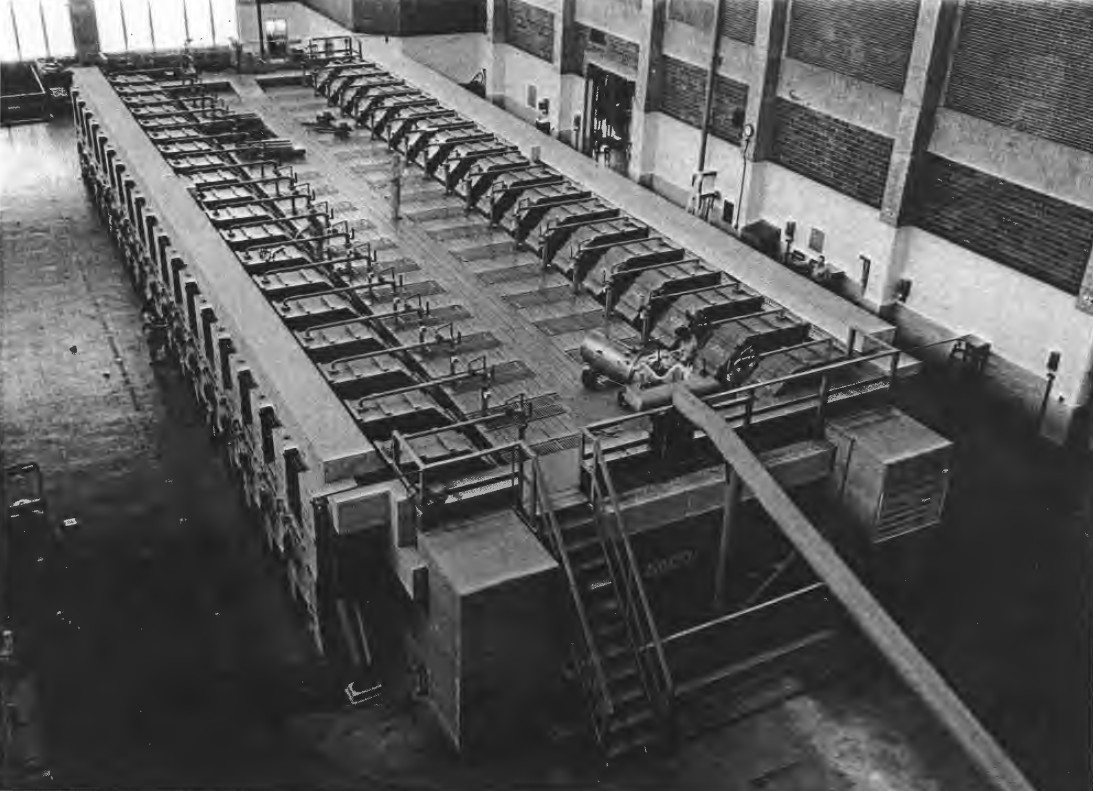
Beta racetrack. These second stage racetracks were smaller than the Alpha racetracks and contained fewer process bins. Note that the oval shape of the Alpha I racetrack has been abandoned for ease of servicing.

The Alpha racetracks were a 24-fold magnification of the XA calutron that could hold 96 calutron Alpha tanks. The calutrons were upright and arrayed facing each other in pairs of inner and outer machines. To minimize magnetic losses, and to economize on steel consumption, the assembly was curved into an oval shape that formed a closed magnetic loop 122 feet (37 m) long, 77 feet (23 m) wide and 15 feet (4.6 m) high, in the shape of a racetrack; hence the name. The two Alpha I buildings, 9201-1 and 9201-2, each contained two racetracks, with only one in the Alpha I1/2, 9201-3. The Beta racetracks were smaller, linear in shape, and optimized for recovery rather than production, with only 36 instead of 96 process bins. The four Alpha II racetracks were also linear in configuration. They incorporated many improvements, the most important being that they had four sources instead of just two. They also had improved magnets and vacuum systems.

Tennessee Eastman was hired to manage Y-12 on the usual cost plus fixed fee basis, with a fee of $22,500 per month plus $7,500 per racetrack for the first seven racetracks and $4,000 per additional racetrack. Workers were recruited in the Knoxville area. The typical recruit was a young woman, a recent graduate of a local high school. Training was initially conducted at the University of Tennessee. Training switched to Berkeley from April to September 1943, where it was conducted on the XA calutron and a 1:16 scale model of the Alpha racetrack, and then to Oak Ridge when the XAX calutron became available. Some 2,500 operators would be required once all the Alpha II calutrons were available. The Tennessee Eastman payroll at Y-12 ballooned from 10,000 in mid-1944 to 22,482 in August 1945. For security reasons, the trainees were not informed of the purpose of the equipment they were taught to operate.

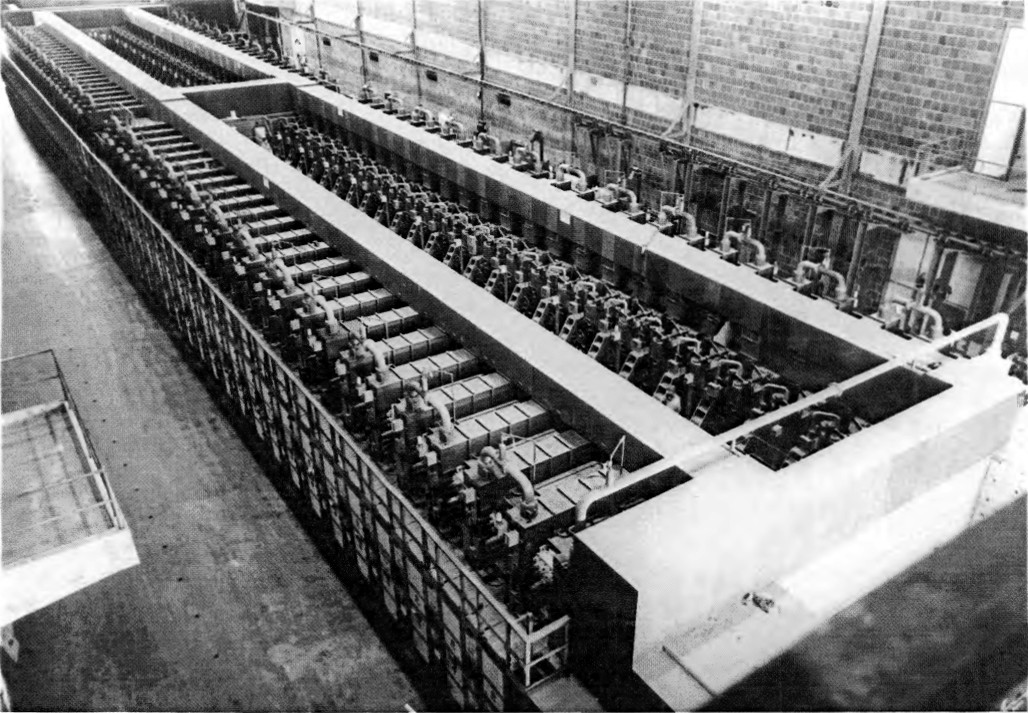
Alpha II racetrack. There were four of these.

The calutrons were initially operated by scientists from Berkeley to remove bugs and achieve a reasonable operating rate. Then the Tennessee Eastman operators took over. Nichols compared unit production data, and pointed out to Lawrence that the young "hillbilly" girl operators were outproducing his Ph.Ds. They agreed to a production race and Lawrence lost, a morale boost for the "Calutron Girls" (called Cubicle Operators at the time) and their supervisors. The women were trained like soldiers not to reason why, while "the scientists could not refrain from time-consuming investigation of the cause of even minor fluctuations of the dials".

For a while, the calutrons suffered from a series of debilitating breakdowns and equipment failures, exacerbated by a shortage of spare parts. Hopes that the Alpha II racetracks would be more reliable soon faded, as they were plagued by insulator failures. These problems were gradually overcome. The first shipments of enriched uranium to the Manhattan Project's Los Alamos Laboratory were made in March 1944, consisting of Alpha product enriched to 13 to 15 percent uranium-235. While of no use in a bomb, it was urgently required for experiments with enriched uranium. The last shipment of Alpha product was made on 11 May 1944. On 7 June 1944, Y-12 made its first delivery of weapons-grade Beta product, enriched to as high as 89% uranium-235.

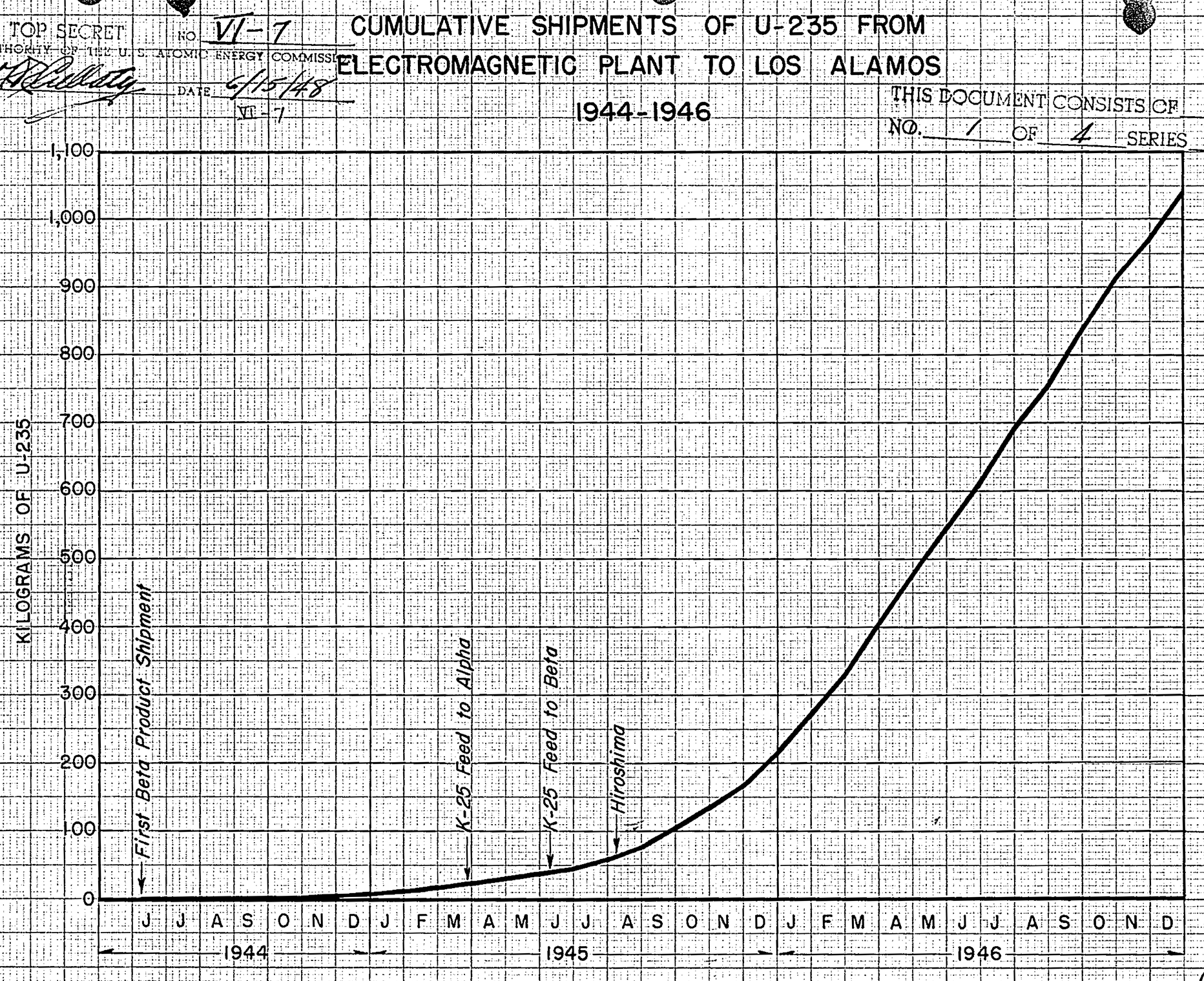

A major problem was that of loss of feed material and product. Only 1 part in 5,825 of the feed material became finished product. About 90 percent was splattered over the feed bottles or vacuum tanks. The problem was particularly acute with the enriched feed of the Beta calutrons. Extraordinary efforts were made to recover product, including burning the carbon receiver liners to recover the uranium in them. Despite everything, some 17.4 percent of Alpha product and 5.4 percent of Beta product was lost. Frank Spedding from the Manhattan Project's Ames Laboratory and Philip Baxter from the British Mission were sent to advise on improvements to recovery methods. The death of a worker from exposure to phosgene also prompted a search for a safer production process.

In February 1945, slightly enriched 1.4 percent uranium-235 feed material began arriving from the S-50 liquid thermal diffusion plant. Shipments of product from S-50 were discontinued in April. S-50 product was fed into K-25 instead. In March 1945, Y-12 began receiving feed enriched to 5 percent from K-25. The output of these plants was in the form of uranium hexafluoride (UF_{6}). It was converted to uranium trioxide, which then went into the usual process for conversion to uranium tetrachloride. On 5 August 1945, K-25 started producing feed enriched to 23 percent, enough to be fed straight into the Beta racetracks. The remaining Alpha product was then fed into K-25. By September 1945, the calutrons had produced 88 kilograms of product with an average enrichment of 84.5 percent, and the Beta racetracks turned out another 953 kilograms enriched to 95 percent by the end of the year. Enriched uranium from the calutrons provided the fissile component of the Little Boy atomic bomb used in the atomic bombing of Hiroshima in August 1945.

Manhattan Project – Electromagnetic project costs through 31 December 1946
| Site | Cost (1946 USD) | Cost (2025 USD) | % of total |
|---|---|---|---|
| Construction | $304 million | $5.02 billion | 53% |
| Operations | $240 million | $3.97 billion | 41.9% |
| Research | $19.6 million | $324 million | 3.4% |
| Design | $6.63 million | $109 million | 1.2% |
| Silver Program | $2.48 million | $41 million | 0.4% |
| Total | $573 million | $9.46 billion | |

With the war over, the Alpha tracks began to suspend operations on 4 September 1945, and ceased operation completely on 22 September. The last two Beta tracks went into full operation in November and December 1945, processing feed from K-25 and the new K-27 gaseous diffusion plant. By May 1946, studies suggested that the gaseous diffusion plants could fully enrich the uranium by themselves without accidentally creating a critical mass. After a trial demonstrated that this was the case, Groves ordered all but one Beta track shut down in December 1946.

The total cost of the electromagnetic project up to the end of the Manhattan Project on 31 December 1946 was $673 million (equivalent to $11.1 billion in 2025).

== Postwar years ==
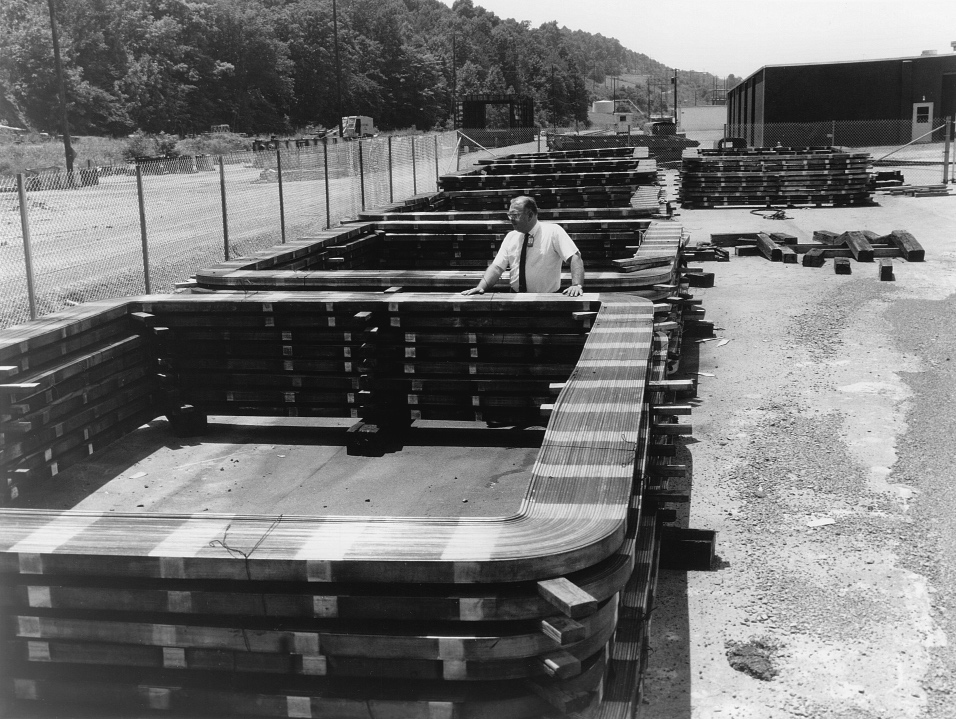
Calutron silver coils prior to their being melted down and returned to the US Treasury.

The workforce at Y-12 dropped from a wartime peak of 22,482 on 21 August 1945 to less than 1,700 in 1949. All the calutrons were removed and dismantled, except for the XAX and XBX training tracks in Building 9731, and the Beta 3 racetracks in Building 9204–3. In 1947, Eugene Wigner, the director of the Oak Ridge National Laboratory (ORNL), asked the Atomic Energy Commission for permission to use the Beta calutrons to produce isotopes for physics experiments. Permission was granted, and a wide range of isotopes was produced. Lithium-6 from the Beta calutrons was used for research into thermonuclear weapons. Many other isotopes were used for peaceful scientific and medical purposes. The Beta 3 racetracks were transferred to the ORNL in March 1950. By the mid-1950s, the Beta calutrons had produced quantities of all the naturally occurring stable isotopes except those of osmium, which had to wait until April 1960. The calutrons continued to produce isotopes until 1998. As of 2015, they are still on standby.

== Other countries ==
=== Soviet Union and China ===
Like the United States, the Soviet Union (USSR) carried out research on multiple enrichment technologies for the Soviet atomic bomb project. A trial electromagnetic process was carried out in 1946 with a calutron using a magnet taken from Germany. A site was chosen for an electromagnetic plant at Sverdlovsk-45 in 1946. The pilot plant, known as Plant 418, was completed in 1948. A more efficient design was developed in which the particle beams were bent by 225° instead of 180° as in the American calutron. It was used to complete the uranium enrichment process after technical difficulties were encountered with the gaseous diffusion process. Uranium enriched to about 40 percent uranium-235 was brought to Sverdlovsk-45 for final enrichment to between 92 and 98 percent. After the problems with the gaseous diffusion process were resolved in 1950, it was decided not to proceed with a full-scale electromagnetic plant. As of 2009, it remains operational. In 1969, a research calutron known as S-2 was built at Arzamas-16 for high-efficiency separation of isotopes of heavy elements like plutonium.

Four research and production calutrons were built at the China Institute of Atomic Energy in Beijing of identical design to those of the USSR in the early 1960s.

=== United Kingdom ===
In 1945, the British atomic bomb project built a 180° calutron, similar in design to an American Beta calutron, at the Atomic Energy Research Establishment at Harwell, Oxfordshire. Owing to the success of the gaseous diffusion plant at Capenhurst, electromagnetic separation was not pursued by the United Kingdom, and the calutron was used to separate isotopes for research. The 180° design was not ideal for this purpose, so Harwell built a 90° calutron, HERMES, the "Heavy Elements and Radioactive Material Electromagnetic Separator". It was inspired by France's SIDONIE and PARIS separators at the Laboratoire René Bernas of the University of Paris IX in Orsay, and PARSIFAL at the military research laboratory of the Commissariat à l'énergie atomique et aux énergies alternatives in Bruyères-le-Châtel.

=== Israel, Japan, and France ===
Israel, Japan and France also built some research calutrons, including the SOLIS and MEIRA separators at the Soreq Nuclear Research Center. There is also CERN's Isotope Separator On-Line Detector (ISOLDE), which was built in 1967.

=== India ===
A calutron at the Saha Institute of Nuclear Physics at Bidhan Nagar in India was used to produce plutonium for India's first nuclear test on 18 May 1974.

=== Iraq ===
After the 1990–91 Gulf War, UNSCOM determined that Iraq had been pursuing a calutron program to enrich uranium. Iraq chose to develop the electromagnetic process over more modern, economic, and efficient methods of enrichment because calutrons were easier to build, with fewer technical challenges, and the components required to build them were not subject to export controls. At the time the program was discovered, Iraq was estimated to be two or three years away from producing enough material for nuclear weapons. The program was destroyed in the Gulf War. Consequently, the Nuclear Suppliers Group added the electromagnetic separation equipment to its guidelines for transfers of nuclear-related dual-use equipment, material and technology.
