= John Francis Neylan =

American lawyer

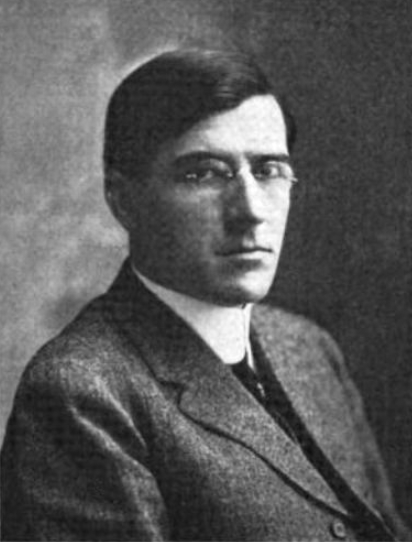
- Born: November 6, 1885; New York, New York
- Died: August 19, 1960 (aged 74); San Francisco, California
- Education: Seton Hall College
- Occupations: Lawyer, journalist, politician
- Political party: Progressive

John Francis Neylan (November 6, 1885 - August 19, 1960) was an American lawyer, journalist, political and educational figure.

== Biography ==
Neylan was born in New York City. After graduation from Seton Hall College in New Jersey in 1903, he went West. California was his destination, but he stopped off in Arizona and worked there for several years as a teamster, bank teller and reporter. The desire for a newspaper career took him to San Francisco and, eventually, a job with the Bulletin. One of his first assignments was to cover Hiram Johnson's first gubernatorial campaign.

Johnson was impressed with the young reporter. After being elected, Johnson appointed the 26-year-old Neylan as Chairman of the State Board of Control, newly established by the legislature in 1911 to oversee agency expenses. The Board installed an accounting system and drew up the state's first budget. It was so successful in regulating the state's finances that it converted the $2,000,000 deficit taken on when Johnson entered office, into an $8,000,000 surplus at the end of six years.

Neylan also studied law while working in Sacramento, and he passed the bar examination in 1916. After Johnson was appointed by the state legislature as US Senator from California, Neylan moved to San Francisco to practice law. He became one of the best known and important lawyers in the state. His talents attracted the attention of William Randolph Hearst. In 1919 Neylan negotiated Hearst's purchase of the Call newspaper and became its publisher. By 1925 the lawyer was Hearst's trusted advisor and became general counsel for all his enterprises. Although their professional relationship ended in 1937, the two remained good friends.

In 1928 Governor Clement C. Young appointed Neylan to the Board of Regents of the University of California, where he served for 27 years. Neylan was an influential member of the Board's Finance Committee and was in great measure responsible for the University's role in the development of atomic research. Neylan and Robert Gordon Sproul were members of the Bohemian Club, and Sproul sponsored Ernest Lawrence's membership in 1932. Through the club, Lawrence met William H. Crocker and Edwin Pauley; influential men who helped him get money for his energy investigations. Neylan believed strongly in Lawrence's vision.

In 1949-1950 Neylan was a central figure in the bitter controversy over the loyalty oath, which the state demanded of people involved with the university system, during the period of fears of Communist influence in academia. He resigned his position as regent in October 1955.

Shortly thereafter he went into semi-retirement. He removed his law practice from San Francisco to Palo Alto, to be nearer to his ranch, Corte Madera. He planned to write his memoirs, but died in San Francisco on August 19, 1960.

Neylan received an honorary degree in Doctor of Law from Oglethorpe University in 1936. He appeared on the cover of Time on April 29, 1935. An extensive collection of his professional and personal papers are on file at the Bancroft Library at the University of California, Berkeley.
