= Robert Lyster Thornton =

British physicist (1908–1985)

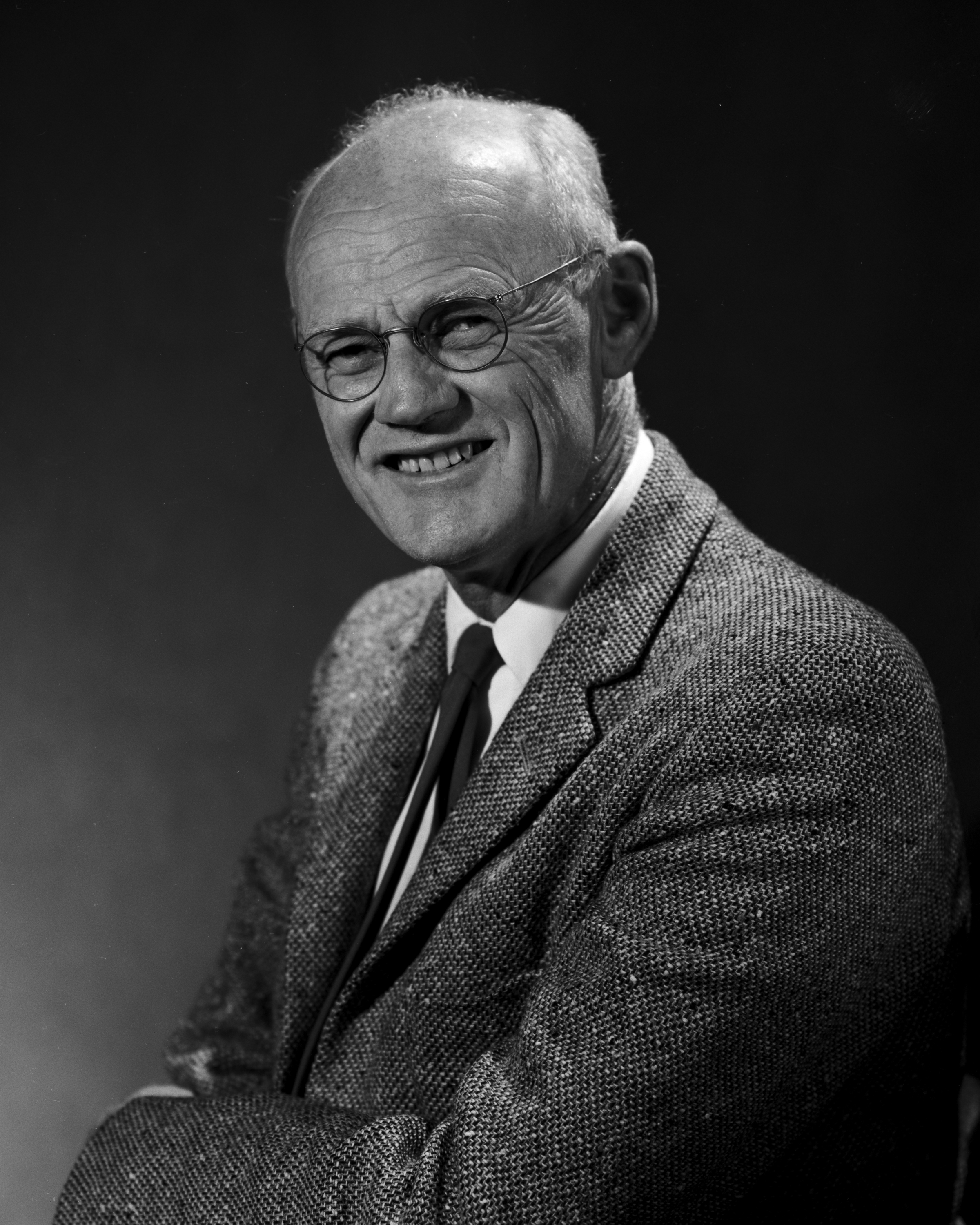
- Thornton in 1961
- Born: 29 November 1908; Wootton, Bedfordshire, England
- Died: 28 September 1985 (aged 76); Berkeley, California
- Citizenship: Britain; United States
- Education: McGill University
- Scientific career
- Fields: Physics
- Workplaces: Lawrence Berkeley Laboratory; Washington University in St. Louis; Clinton Engineer Works; Lawrence Livermore Laboratory
- Thesis: The Stark effect for krypton; Stark intensities in hydrogen and helium (1933)
- Doctoral advisor: John Stuart Foster

Robert Lyster Thornton (29 November 1908 – 28 September 1985) was a British-Canadian-American physicist who worked on the cyclotrons at Ernest Lawrence's Radiation Laboratory in the 1930s. During World War II he assisted with the development of the calutron as part of the Manhattan Project. He returned to Berkeley in 1945 to lead the construction of the 184-inch (470 cm) cyclotron, and spent the rest of his career there.

== Biography ==
Robert Lyster Thornton was born in Wootton, Bedfordshire, England, on 29 November 1908, the son of Dudley L. Thornton, a mechanical engineer, and his wife Katherine née Foster. The family emigrated to Canada when his father worked for the Canadian Pacific Railway. He entered McGill University, earning his B.Sc. in 1930 and then his Ph.D. in 1933, writing his thesis on "The Stark effect for krypton; Stark intensities in hydrogen and helium" under the supervision of John Stuart Foster, an expert on the Stark effect. His results were subsequently published in the Proceedings of the Royal Society.

In 1933, Thornton attended University of California, Berkeley on a Moyse Traveling Scholarship from McGill University. He joined Ernest Lawrence's Radiation Laboratory, one of nine scholars from the British Commonwealth who worked there in the 1930s. He was one of the early pioneers of the cyclotron, a group that included Bernard Kinsey, Franz Kurie, Edwin McMillan, Arthur Snell and Stanley van Voorhis. Indeed, it was in a 1935 paper he co-authored with Lawrence and McMillan that the term "cyclotron" first appeared. He later bemoaned the fact that little valuable physics was done owing to the Radiation Laboratory's preoccupation with the cyclotrons and the detectors, but he was involved in an exploration of the Oppenheimer–Phillips process. In 1938 he married Mary Elizabeth (Betty) Edie. They had three children.

Other universities were eager to secure cyclotron technology, and Thornton helped the University of Michigan set up one in 1935. In 1940 he left Berkeley for a position as an associate professor at Washington University in St. Louis, where he again built a cyclotron, but he returned to Berkeley in 1942 at Lawrence's request to assist with the development of the calutron. This was a device for uranium enrichment using electromagnetic separation, as part of the Manhattan Project, the effort to develop atomic bombs during World War II. He worked in Boston with Stone and Webster, and eventually became assistant director of the Process Improvement Division of the Eastman Chemical Company at the Clinton Engineer Works at Oak Ridge, Tennessee. During the war he became a naturalized US citizen.

After the war ended he returned to the Arts and Sciences at Washington University in St. Louis, where Arthur H. Compton was building up the physics department. Compton offered Thornton directorship of the new nuclear laboratory there, but Thornton turned down the offer. He also declined an offer of directorship of the Chalk River Laboratories in Canada. Instead, he returned to Berkeley in 1945 to head the work on the new 184-inch (470 cm) cyclotron, the completion of which had been delayed by the war. Under a special arrangement between Lawrence and Robert Gordon Sproul, Thornton was made a professor of physics at the Radiation Laboratory. In the early post-war years, the 184-inch cyclotron would be at the forefront of physics, being particularly useful in the exploration of the meson. Thornton became a professor at the University of California in 1948, and started teaching courses in mechanics, and electricity and magnetism. He found he enjoyed teaching.

Thornton became the assistant director of the Radiation Laboratory in 1954, associate director in 1959, and associate director of program and planning in 1967. He retired in 1972, but worked part-time at the Lawrence Livermore National Laboratory for another ten years, after which he returned to the Lawrence Berkeley National Laboratory as a consultant. His wife Betty died in 1974. In 1977 he married again, to Sigvor Hamre, the widow of Haakon Hamre, a professor of Scandinavian language and literature at Berkeley. He died in Berkeley on 28 September 1985.
