= Donald Cooksey =

American physicist

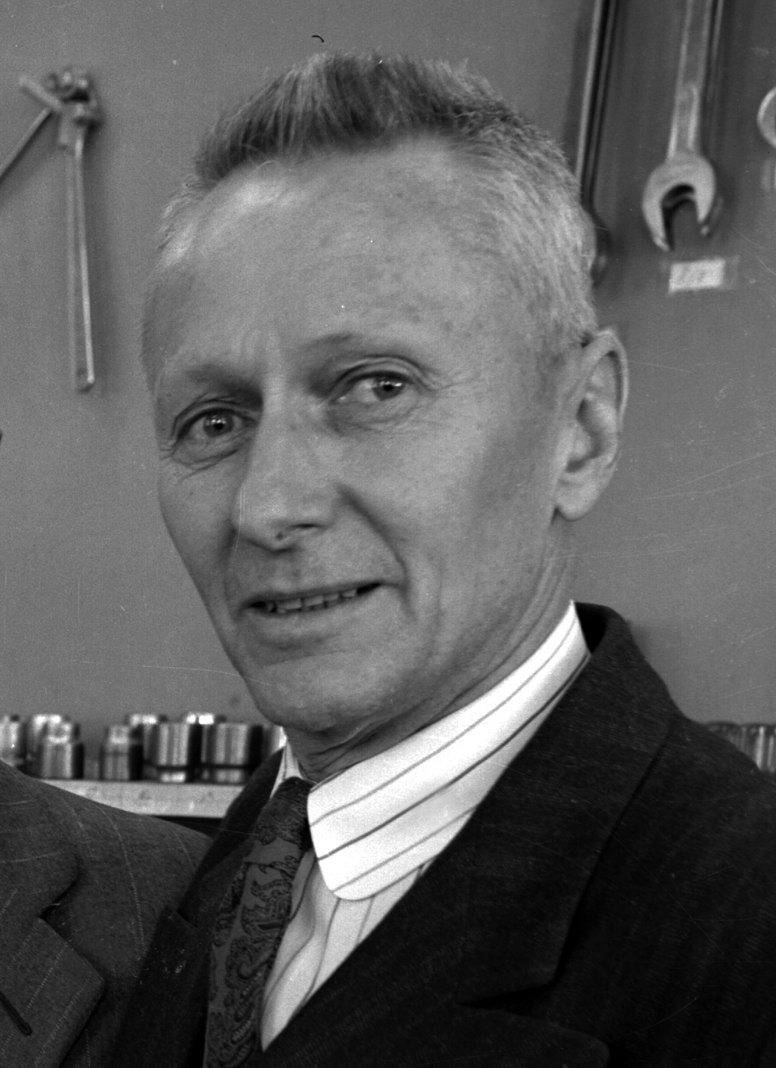
Donald Cooksey in 1943

Donald Cooksey (May 15, 1892 – August 19, 1977), was an American physicist who was associate director of the Lawrence Radiation Laboratory of the University of California at Berkeley.

== Biography ==
Cooksey was the son of George Cooksey from Birmingham, England and Linda Dows from New York. After completing high school at the Thacher School in California, Donald followed his brother Charlton Cooksey, a physics professor at Yale University. At Yale, he became a physicist specializing in designing and building scientific instruments, especially detectors for measuring sub-atomic particles such as neutrons.

When Ernest O. Lawrence was at Yale during the 1920s, Cooksey and Lawrence became friends. In 1932, Lawrence moved to Berkeley, California to set up the Radiation Laboratory. Lawrence asked Cooksey to come to Berkeley to make detectors for use with Lawrence's cyclotrons. Cooksey continued to be a close associate of Lawrence and became associate director of the Lawrence Radiation Laboratory of the University of California at Berkeley.

Donald Cooksey and his wife Milicent Sperry had a son, Donald Dows Cooksey (b. 1944), and a daughter, Helen Sperry Cooksey (b. 1947), who became a surgeon.
