= Eugene Gardner =

American physicist

Milton Eugene Gardner
- Born: February 10, 1901; Santa Cruz, California, U.S.
- Died: 1986
- Known for: Work on radar

Milton Eugene Gardner (February 10, 1901 – 1986) was an American physicist who worked on radar systems at the Radiation Laboratory in Massachusetts.

== Early life ==
He was born in Santa Cruz, California.

After spending the first nine years of his life in China, Milton moved with his family to Claremont, California where he completed his elementary and secondary education. In 1924 he received a B.A. degree from Pomona College. While at Pomona, Milton competed in athletics competitions, and became a ventriloquist, and a magician. Gerdener belonged to the International Brotherhood of Magicians. After graduating from college, he worked at several jobs before starting graduate work in physics at UC Berkeley, where he received his M.A. degree in 1934, with a thesis on "The recombination of ions in pure oxygen as a function of pressure and temperature." He received his Ph.D. degree in 1936. In 1937, Milton accepted a position as an "instructor in physics" at the then "Branch of the College of Agriculture at Davis" where he remained until his retirement as professor of physics in 1968.

== Career ==
From 1942 to 1946, he joined the MIT Radiation Laboratory in Cambridge, Massachusetts where he helped in the effort to develop and improve the radar systems which were of importance in enabling the Allied Forces to overcome the German and Japanese armies.

Gardner spent the 1955-1956 academic year at the University of Peshawar in Pakistan.

== Death ==
Gardner died in 1986 of beryllium poisoning.
