= Ernest Lawrence =

American physicist (1901–1958)

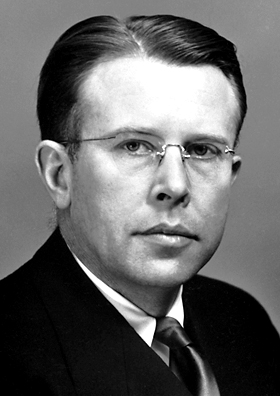
- Lawrence in 1939

1st Director of the Berkeley Radiation Laboratory
- In office 1931–1958
- Preceded by: Office established
- Succeeded by: Edwin McMillan

Personal details
- Born: Ernest Orlando Lawrence; August 8, 1901 Canton, South Dakota, U.S.
- Died: August 27, 1958 (aged 57) Palo Alto, California, U.S.
- Spouse: Mary Blumer (m. 1932)
- Relatives: John H. Lawrence (brother)
- Education: University of South Dakota (grad. 1922); University of Minnesota (grad. 1923); Yale University (grad. 1925)
- Known for: Invention of the cyclotron
- Awards: See list: Elliott Cresson Medal (1937); Hughes Medal (1937); Comstock Prize in Physics (1938); Nobel Prize in Physics (1939); Duddell Medal and Prize (1940); Holley Medal (1942); Medal for Merit (1946); William Procter Prize for Scientific Achievement (1951); Faraday Medal (1952); Enrico Fermi Award (1957); Sylvanus Thayer Award (1958)
- Scientific career
- Fields: Physics
- Workplaces: University of California, Berkeley
- Thesis: The Photoelectric Effect in Potassium Vapor as a Function of the Frequency of the Light (1925)
- Doctoral advisor: W. F. G. Swann
- Doctoral students: A. Carl Helmholz; Milton S. Livingston; Hugh C. Paxton; John Reginald Richardson; Robert R. Wilson; Chien-Shiung Wu

Ernest Orlando Lawrence (August 8, 1901 – August 27, 1958) was an American physicist who received the Nobel Prize in Physics in 1939 for his invention of the cyclotron. He is known for his work on uranium-isotope separation for the Manhattan Project, as well as for founding the Lawrence Berkeley National Laboratory and the Lawrence Livermore National Laboratory.

A graduate of the University of South Dakota and University of Minnesota, Lawrence obtained a PhD in physics at Yale in 1925. In 1928, he was hired as an associate professor of physics at the University of California, Berkeley, becoming the youngest full professor there two years later. In its library one evening, Lawrence was intrigued by a diagram of an accelerator that produced high-energy particles. He contemplated how it could be made compact, and came up with an idea for a circular accelerating chamber between the poles of an electromagnet. The result was the first cyclotron.

Lawrence went on to build a series of ever larger and more expensive cyclotrons. His Radiation Laboratory became an official department of the University of California in 1936, with Lawrence as its director. In addition to the use of the cyclotron for physics, Lawrence also supported its use in research into medical uses of radioisotopes. During World War II, Lawrence developed electromagnetic isotope separation at the Radiation Laboratory. It used devices known as calutrons, a hybrid of the standard laboratory mass spectrometer and cyclotron. A huge electromagnetic separation plant was built at Oak Ridge, Tennessee, which came to be called Y-12. The process was inefficient, but it worked.

After the war, Lawrence campaigned extensively for government sponsorship of large scientific programs, and was a forceful advocate of "Big Science", with its requirements for big machines and big money. Lawrence strongly backed Edward Teller's campaign for a second nuclear weapons laboratory, which Lawrence located in Livermore, California. After his death, the Regents of the University of California renamed the Lawrence Livermore National Laboratory and Lawrence Berkeley National Laboratory after him. Chemical element number 103 was named lawrencium in his honor after its discovery at Berkeley in 1961.

== Education ==
Ernest Orlando Lawrence was born on August 8, 1901 in Canton, South Dakota. His parents, Carl Gustavus (1871–1954) and Gunda Regina Jacobson (1874–1959), were both the offspring of Norwegian immigrants who had met while teaching at the high school in Canton, where his father was also the superintendent of schools. He had a younger brother, John H. Lawrence, who would become a physician, and was a pioneer in the field of nuclear medicine. Growing up, his best friend was Merle Tuve, who would also go on to become a highly accomplished physicist.

Lawrence attended the public schools of Canton and Pierre, then enrolled at St. Olaf College in Northfield, Minnesota, but transferred after a year to the University of South Dakota in Vermillion. He completed his bachelor's degree in chemistry in 1922, and his M.A. in Physics from the University of Minnesota in 1923 under the supervision of William Francis Gray Swann. For his master's thesis, Lawrence built an experimental apparatus that rotated an ellipsoid through a magnetic field.

Lawrence followed Swann to the University of Chicago, and then to Yale University in New Haven, Connecticut, where Lawrence completed his Ph.D. in Physics in 1925 as a National Research Fellow, writing his doctoral thesis on the photoelectric effect in potassium vapor. He was elected a member of Sigma Xi, and, on Swann's recommendation, received a National Research Council fellowship. Instead of using it to travel to Europe, as was customary at the time, he remained at Yale University with Swann as a researcher.

With Jesse Beams from the University of Virginia, Lawrence continued to research the photoelectric effect. They showed that photoelectrons appeared within 2 × 10^{−9} seconds of the photons striking the photoelectric surface—close to the limit of measurement at the time. Reducing the emission time by switching the light source on and off rapidly made the spectrum of energy emitted broader, in conformance with Werner Heisenberg's uncertainty principle.

== Early career ==
In 1926 and 1927, Lawrence received offers of assistant professorships from the University of Washington in Seattle and the University of California at a salary of $3,500 per annum (equivalent to $64,900 in 2025). Yale promptly matched the offer of the assistant professorship, but at a salary of $3,000. Lawrence chose to stay at the more prestigious Yale, but because he had never been an instructor, the appointment was resented by some of his fellow faculty, and in the eyes of many it still did not compensate for his South Dakota immigrant background.

Lawrence was hired as an associate professor of physics at the University of California in 1928. He became a full professor two years later, becoming the university's youngest professor. Based on Frédéric and Irène Joliot-Curie's 1934 published work on artificial radioactivity, Lawrence discovered the nitrogen-13 isotope by firing high-energy protons into a carbon-13 element in his laboratory. He and his team including Martin Kamen and Samuel Ruben accidentally discovered the carbon-14 isotope by bombarding graphite with high-energy protons. Robert Gordon Sproul, who became university president the day after Lawrence became a professor, was a member of the Bohemian Club, and he sponsored Lawrence's membership in 1932. Through this club, Lawrence met William Henry Crocker, Edwin Pauley, and John Francis Neylan. They were influential men who helped him obtain money for his energetic nuclear particle investigations. There was great hope for medical uses to come from the development of particle physics, and this led to much of the early funding that Lawrence was able to obtain for research.

While at Yale, Lawrence met Mary Kimberly (Molly) Blumer, the eldest of four daughters of George Blumer, the dean of the Yale School of Medicine. They first met in 1926 and became engaged in 1931, and were married on May 14, 1932, at Trinity Church on the Green in New Haven, Connecticut. They had six children: Eric, Margaret, Mary, Robert, Barbara, and Susan. Lawrence named his son Robert after theoretical physicist Robert Oppenheimer, his closest friend in Berkeley. In 1941, Molly's sister Elsie married Edwin McMillan, who would go on to win the Nobel Prize in Chemistry in 1951 with Glenn T. Seaborg.

== Cyclotron ==
=== Invention ===
The invention that brought Lawrence to international fame started out as a sketch on a scrap of a paper napkin. While sitting in the library one evening in 1929, Lawrence glanced over a journal article by Rolf Widerøe, and was intrigued by one of the diagrams. This depicted a device that produced high-energy particles by means of a succession of small "pushes". The device depicted was laid out in a straight line using increasingly longer electrodes. At the time, physicists were beginning to explore the atomic nucleus. In 1919, the New Zealand physicist Ernest Rutherford had fired alpha particles into nitrogen and had succeeded in knocking protons out of some of the nuclei. But nuclei have a positive charge that repels other positively charged nuclei, and they are bound together tightly by a force that physicists were only just beginning to understand. To break them up, to disintegrate them, would require much higher energies, of the order of millions of volts.

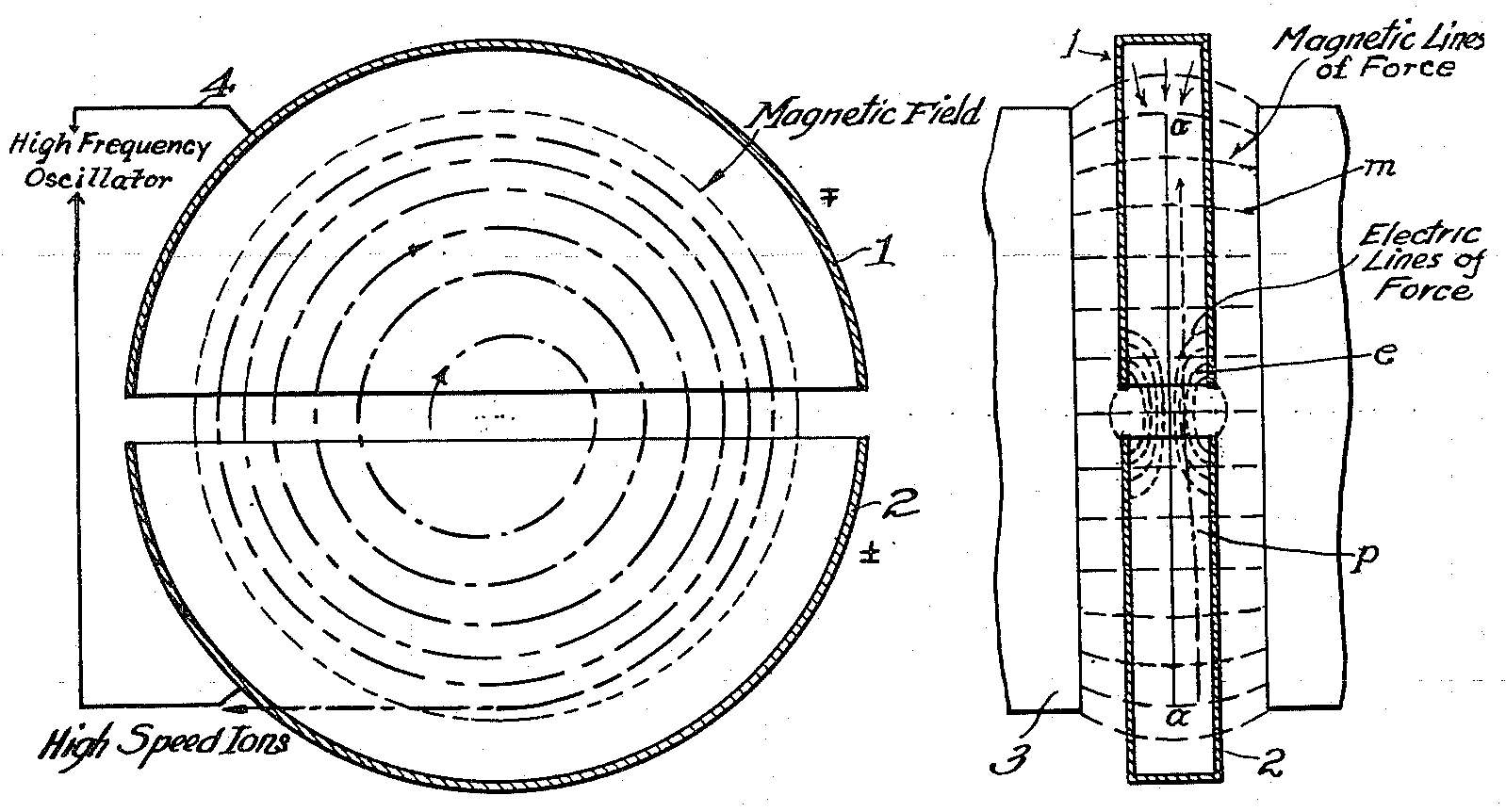
Diagram of cyclotron operation from Lawrence's 1934 patent

Lawrence saw that such a particle accelerator would soon become too long and unwieldy for his university laboratory. In pondering a way to make the accelerator more compact, Lawrence decided to set a circular accelerating chamber between the poles of an electromagnet. The magnetic field would hold the charged protons in a spiral path as they were accelerated between just two semicircular electrodes connected to an alternating potential. After a hundred turns or so, the protons would impact the target as a beam of high-energy particles. Lawrence excitedly told his colleagues that he had discovered a method for obtaining particles of very high energy without the use of any high voltage. He initially worked with Niels Edlefsen. Their first cyclotron was made out of brass, wire, and sealing wax and was only four inches (10 cm) in diameter—it could be held in one hand, and probably cost a total of $25 (equivalent to $600 in 2025).

What Lawrence needed to develop the idea was capable graduate students to do the work. Edlefsen left to take up an assistant professorship in September 1930, and Lawrence replaced him with David H. Sloan and M. Stanley Livingston, whom he set to work on developing Widerøe's accelerator and Edlefsen's cyclotron, respectively. Both had their own financial support. Both designs proved practical, and by May 1931, Sloan's linear accelerator was able to accelerate ions to 1 MeV. Livingston had a greater technical challenge, but when he applied 1,800 V to his 11-inch cyclotron on January 2, 1931, he got 80,000-electron volt protons spinning around. A week later, he had 1.22 MeV with 3,000 V, more than enough for his PhD thesis on its construction.

=== Development ===
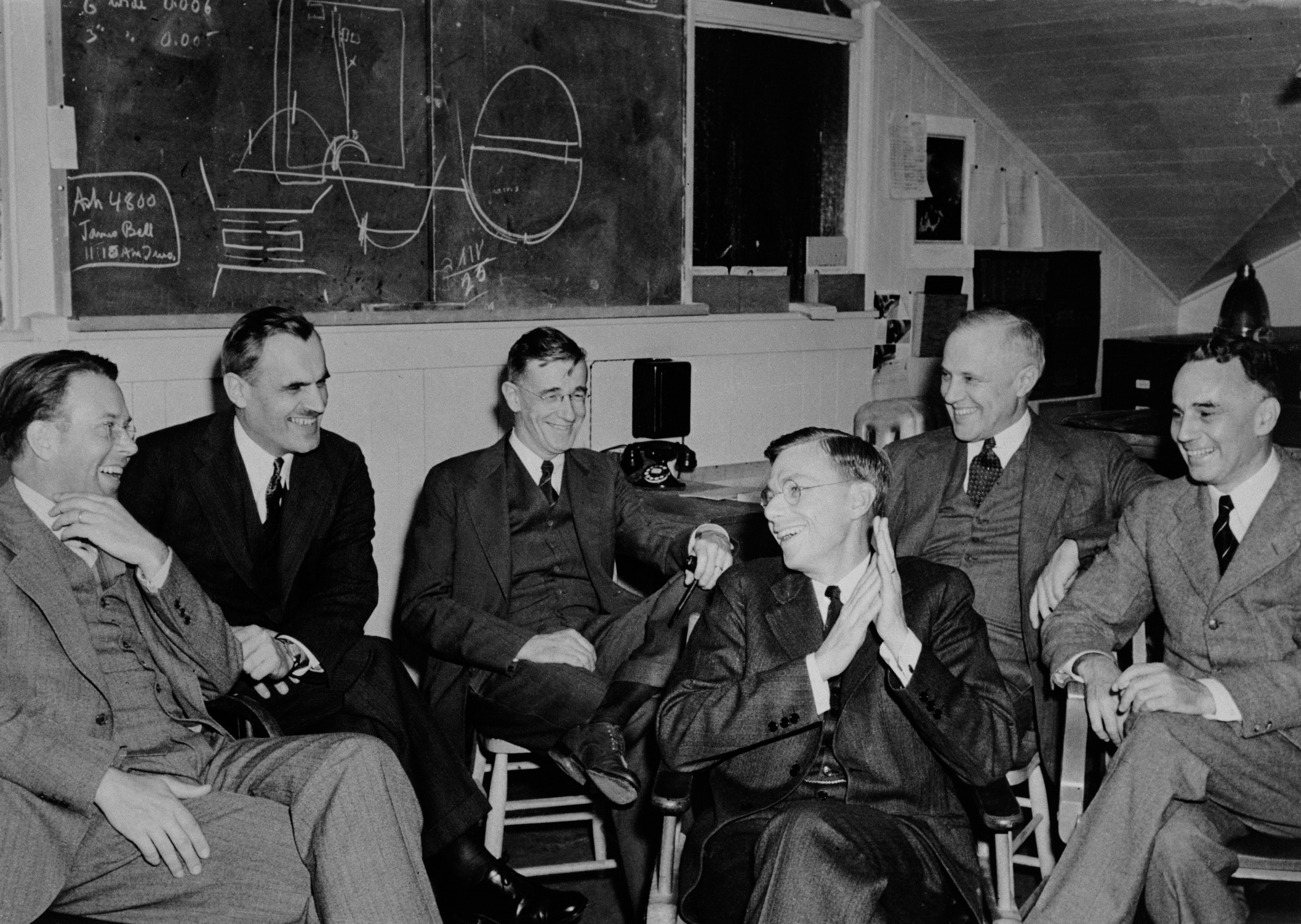
Meeting at Berkeley in 1940 concerning the planned 184-inch (4.67 m) cyclotron (seen on the blackboard): Lawrence, Arthur Compton, Vannevar Bush, James B. Conant, Karl T. Compton, and Alfred Lee Loomis

In what would become a recurring pattern, as soon as there was the first sign of success, Lawrence started planning a new, bigger machine. Lawrence and Livingston drew up a design for a 27-inch (69 cm) cyclotron in early 1932. The magnet for the $800 11-inch cyclotron weighed 2 tons, but Lawrence found a massive 80-ton magnet rusting in a junkyard in Palo Alto for the 27-inch that had originally been built during World War I to power a transatlantic radio link. In the cyclotron, he had a powerful scientific instrument, but this did not translate into scientific discovery. In April 1932, John Cockcroft and Ernest Walton at the Cavendish Laboratory in England announced that they had bombarded lithium with protons and succeeded in transmuting it into helium. The energy required turned out to be quite low—well within the capability of the 11-inch cyclotron. On learning about it, Lawrence sent a wire to Berkeley and asked for Cockcroft and Walton's results to be verified. It took the team until September to do so, mainly due to lack of adequate detection apparatus.

Although important discoveries continued to elude Lawrence's Radiation Laboratory, mainly due to its focus on the development of the cyclotron rather than its scientific use, through his increasingly larger machines, Lawrence was able to provide crucial equipment needed for experiments in high energy physics. Around this device, he built what became the world's foremost laboratory for the new field of nuclear physics research in the 1930s. He received a patent for the cyclotron in 1934, which he assigned to the Research Corporation, a private foundation that funded much of Lawrence's early work.

In February 1936, Harvard University's president, James B. Conant, made attractive offers to Lawrence and Oppenheimer. The University of California's president, Robert Gordon Sproul, responded by improving conditions. The Radiation Laboratory became an official department of the University of California on July 1, 1936, with Lawrence formally appointed its director, with a full-time assistant director, and the university agreed to make $20,000 a year available for its research activities (equivalent to $360,000 in 2025). Lawrence employed a simple business model: "He staffed his laboratory with graduate students and junior faculty of the physics department, with fresh Ph.D.s willing to work for anything, and with fellowship holders and wealthy guests able to serve for nothing."

=== Reception ===
Using the new 27-inch cyclotron, the team at Berkeley discovered that every element that they bombarded with recently discovered deuterium emitted energy, and in the same range. They, therefore, postulated the existence of a new and hitherto unknown particle that was a possible source of limitless energy. William Laurence of The New York Times described Lawrence as "a new miracle worker of science". At Cockcroft's invitation, Lawrence attended the 1933 Solvay Conference in Belgium. This was a regular gathering of the world's top physicists. Nearly all were from Europe, but occasionally an outstanding American scientist like Robert A. Millikan or Arthur Compton would be invited to attend. Lawrence was asked to give a presentation on the cyclotron. Lawrence's claims of limitless energy met a very different reception in Solvay. He ran into withering skepticism from the Cavendish Laboratory's James Chadwick, the physicist who had discovered the neutron in 1932, for which he was awarded the Nobel Prize in 1935. In a British accent that sounded condescending to Lawrence's ears, Chadwick suggested that what Lawrence's team was observing was contamination of their apparatus.

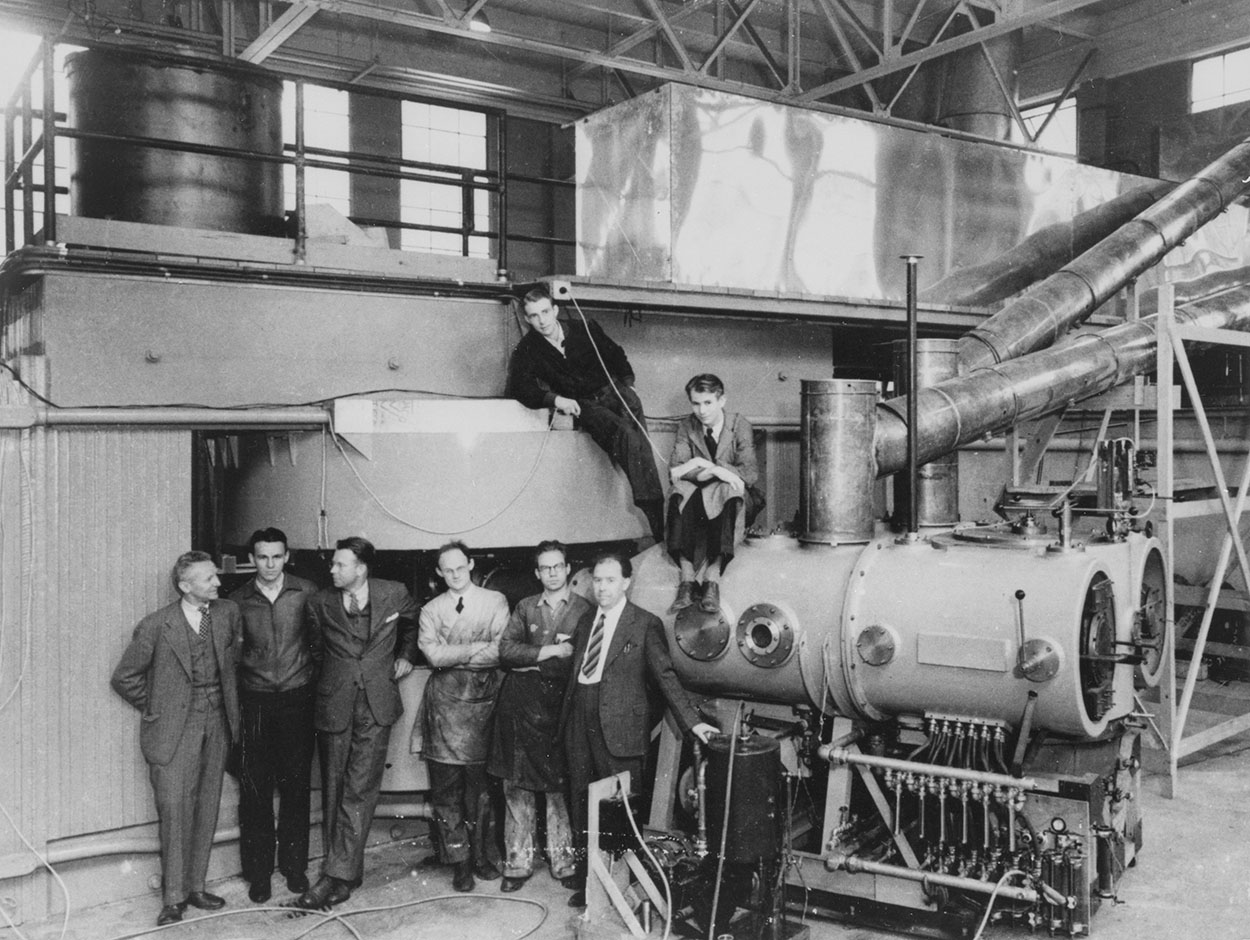
The 60-inch (1.52 m) cyclotron soon after completion in 1939. The key figures in its development and use are shown, standing, left to right: Donald Cooksey, Dale R. Corson, Ernest Lawrence, Robert L. Thornton, John Backus, and Winfield Salisbury. In the background are Luis Alvarez and Edwin McMillan.

When he returned to Berkeley, Lawrence mobilized his team to go painstakingly over the results to gather enough evidence to convince Chadwick. Meanwhile, at the Cavendish laboratory, Rutherford and Mark Oliphant found that deuterium fuses to form helium-3, which causes the effect that the cyclotroneers had observed. Not only was Chadwick correct in that they had been observing contamination, but they had overlooked yet another important discovery, that of nuclear fusion. Lawrence's response was to press on with the creation of still larger cyclotrons. The 27-inch cyclotron was superseded by a 37-inch cyclotron in June 1937, which in turn was superseded by a 60-inch cyclotron in May 1939. It was used to bombard iron and produced its first radioactive isotopes in June.

As it was easier to raise money for medical purposes, particularly cancer treatment, than for nuclear physics, Lawrence encouraged the use of the cyclotron for medical research. Working with his brother John and Israel Lyon Chaikoff from the University of California's physiology department, Lawrence supported research into the use of radioactive isotopes for therapeutic purposes. Phosphorus-32 was easily produced in the cyclotron, and John used it to cure a woman afflicted with polycythemia vera, a blood disease. John used phosphorus-32 created in the 37-inch cyclotron in 1938 in tests on mice with leukemia. He found that the radioactive phosphorus concentrated in the fast-growing cancer cells. This then led to clinical trials on human patients. A 1948 evaluation of the therapy showed that remissions occurred under certain circumstances. Lawrence also had hoped for the medical use of neutrons. The first cancer patient received neutron therapy from the 60-inch cyclotron on November 20. Chaikoff conducted trials on the use of radioactive isotopes as radioactive tracers to explore the mechanism of biochemical reactions.

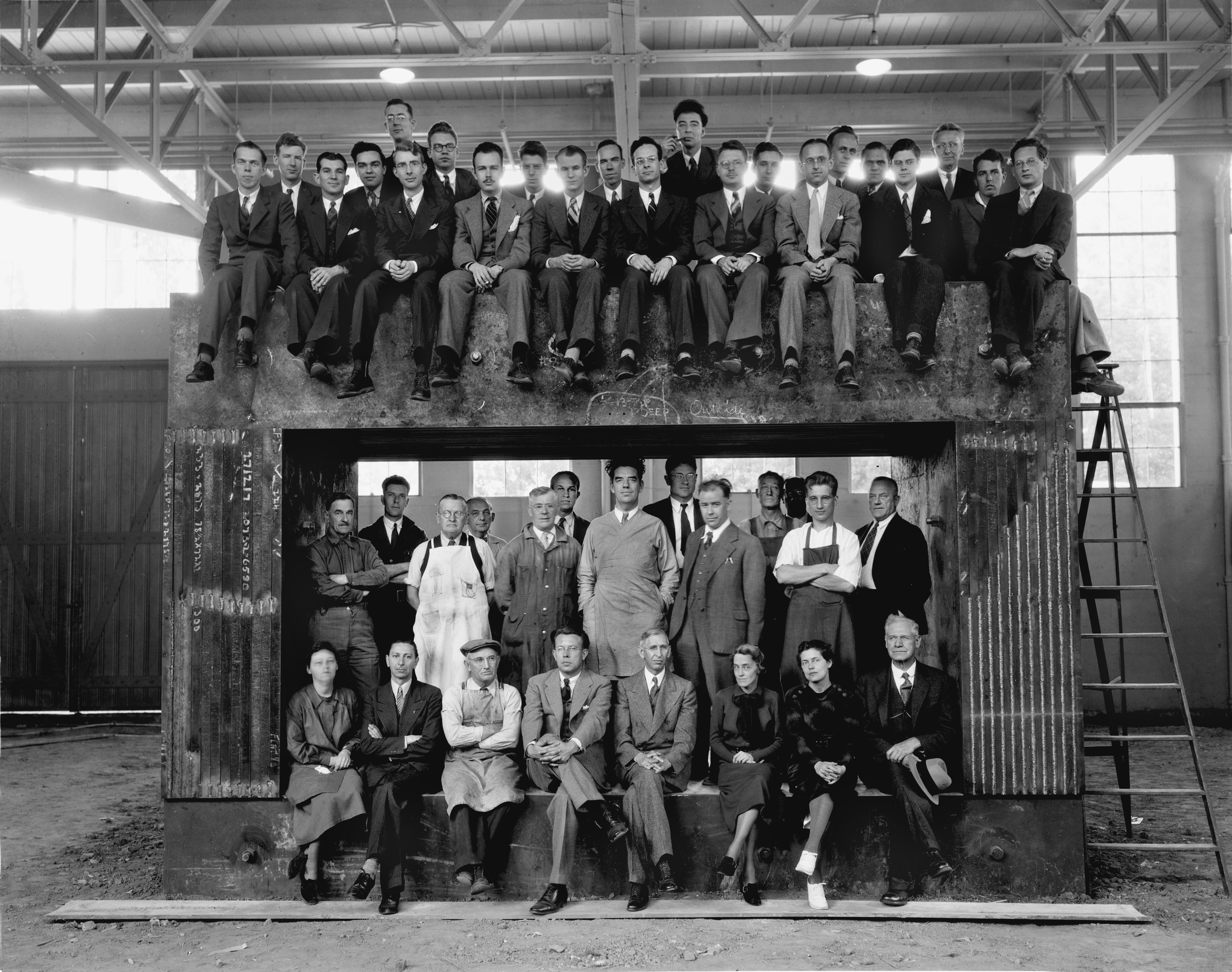
University of California Radiation Laboratory staff framed by the magnet for the 60-inch cyclotron, 1938; Nobel prize winners Ernest Lawrence, Edwin McMillan, and Luis Alvarez are shown, in addition to J. Robert Oppenheimer and Robert R. Wilson.

Lawrence was awarded the Nobel Prize in Physics in November 1939 "for the invention and development of the cyclotron and for results obtained with it, especially with regard to artificial radioactive elements". He was the first at Berkeley as well as the first South Dakotan to become a Nobel Laureate, and the first to be so honored while at a state-supported university. The Nobel award ceremony was held on February 29, 1940, in Berkeley, California, due to World War II, in the auditorium of Wheeler Hall on the campus of the university. Lawrence received his medal from Carl Edvard Wallerstedt, Sweden's Consul General in San Francisco. Robert W. Wood wrote to Lawrence and presciently noted "As you are laying the foundations for the cataclysmic explosion of uranium ... I'm sure old Nobel would approve."

In March 1940, Arthur Compton, Vannevar Bush, James B. Conant, Karl T. Compton, and Alfred Lee Loomis traveled to Berkeley to discuss Lawrence's proposal for a 184-inch cyclotron with a 4,500-ton magnet that was estimated to cost $2.65 million (equivalent to $48,000,000 in 2025). The Rockefeller Foundation provided $1.15 million to get the project started.

== World War II and the Manhattan Project ==
=== Radiation Laboratory ===
After the outbreak of World War II in Europe, Lawrence became drawn into military projects. He helped recruit staff for the MIT Radiation Laboratory, where American physicists developed the cavity magnetron invented by Mark Oliphant's team in Britain. The name of the new laboratory was deliberately copied from Lawrence's laboratory in Berkeley for security reasons. He also became involved in recruiting staff for underwater sound laboratories to develop techniques for detecting German submarines. Meanwhile, work continued at Berkeley with cyclotrons. In December 1940, Glenn T. Seaborg and Emilio Segrè used the 60-inch (150 cm) cyclotron to bombard uranium-238 with deuterons producing a new element, neptunium-238, which decayed by beta emission to form plutonium-238. One of its isotopes, plutonium-239, could undergo nuclear fission, which provided another way to make an atomic bomb.

Lawrence offered Segrè a job as a research assistant—a relatively lowly position for someone who had discovered an element—for US$300 a month for six months. However, when Lawrence learned that Segrè was legally trapped in California, he reduced Segrè's salary further to US$116 a month. When the regents of the University of California wanted to terminate Segrè's employment owing to his foreign nationality, Lawrence managed to retain Segrè by hiring him as a part-time lecturer paid by the Rockefeller Foundation. Similar arrangements were made to retain his doctoral students Chien-Shiung Wu (a Chinese national) and Kenneth Ross MacKenzie (a Canadian national) when they graduated.

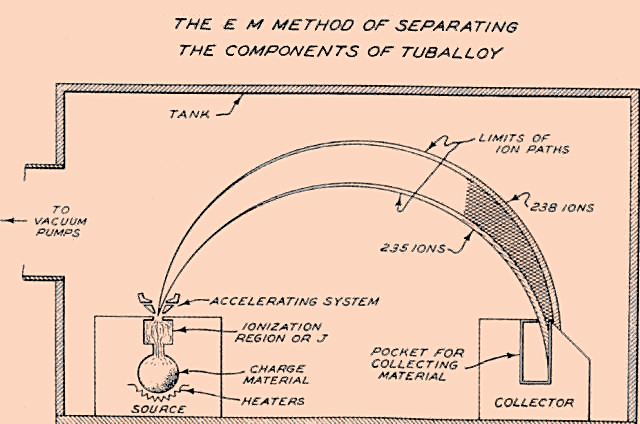
Schematic diagram of uranium isotope separation in a calutron

In September 1941, Oliphant met with Lawrence and Oppenheimer at Berkeley, where they showed him the site for the new 184-inch (4.7 m) cyclotron. Oliphant, in turn, took the Americans to task for not following up the recommendations of the British MAUD Committee, which advocated a program to develop an atomic bomb. Lawrence had already thought about the problem of separating the fissile isotope uranium-235 from uranium-238, a process known today as uranium enrichment. Separating uranium isotopes was difficult because the two isotopes have very nearly identical chemical properties, and could only be separated gradually using their small mass differences. Separating isotopes with a mass spectrometer was a technique Oliphant had pioneered with lithium in 1934.

Lawrence began converting his old 37-inch cyclotron into a giant mass spectrometer. On his recommendation, the director of the Manhattan Project, Brigadier General Leslie R. Groves Jr., appointed Oppenheimer as head of its Los Alamos Laboratory in New Mexico. While the Radiation laboratory developed the electromagnetic uranium enrichment process, the Los Alamos Laboratory designed and constructed the atomic bombs. Like the Radiation Laboratory, it was run by the University of California.

Electromagnetic isotope separation used devices known as calutrons, a hybrid of two laboratory instruments, the mass spectrometer and cyclotron. The name was derived from "California university cyclotrons". In November 1943, Lawrence's team at Berkeley was bolstered by 29 British scientists, including Oliphant.

In the electromagnetic process, a magnetic field deflected charged particles according to mass. The process was neither scientifically elegant nor industrially efficient. Compared with a gaseous diffusion plant or a nuclear reactor, an electromagnetic separation plant would consume more scarce materials, require more manpower to operate, and cost more to build. Nonetheless, the process was approved because it was based on proven technology and therefore represented less risk. Moreover, it could be built in stages, and would rapidly reach industrial capacity.

=== Oak Ridge ===
Responsibility for the design and construction of the electromagnetic separation plant at Oak Ridge, Tennessee, which came to be called Y-12, was assigned to Stone & Webster. The calutrons, using 14,700 tons of silver, were manufactured by Allis-Chalmers in Milwaukee and shipped to Oak Ridge. The design called for five first-stage processing units, known as Alpha racetracks, and two units for final processing, known as Beta racetracks. In September 1943 Groves authorized construction of four more racetracks, known as Alpha II. When the plant was started up for testing on schedule in October 1943, the 14-ton vacuum tanks crept out of alignment because of the power of the magnets and had to be fastened more securely. A more serious problem arose when the magnetic coils started shorting out. In December Groves ordered a magnet to be broken open, and handfuls of rust were found inside. Groves then ordered the racetracks to be torn down and the magnets sent back to the factory to be cleaned. A pickling plant was established on-site to clean the pipes and fittings.

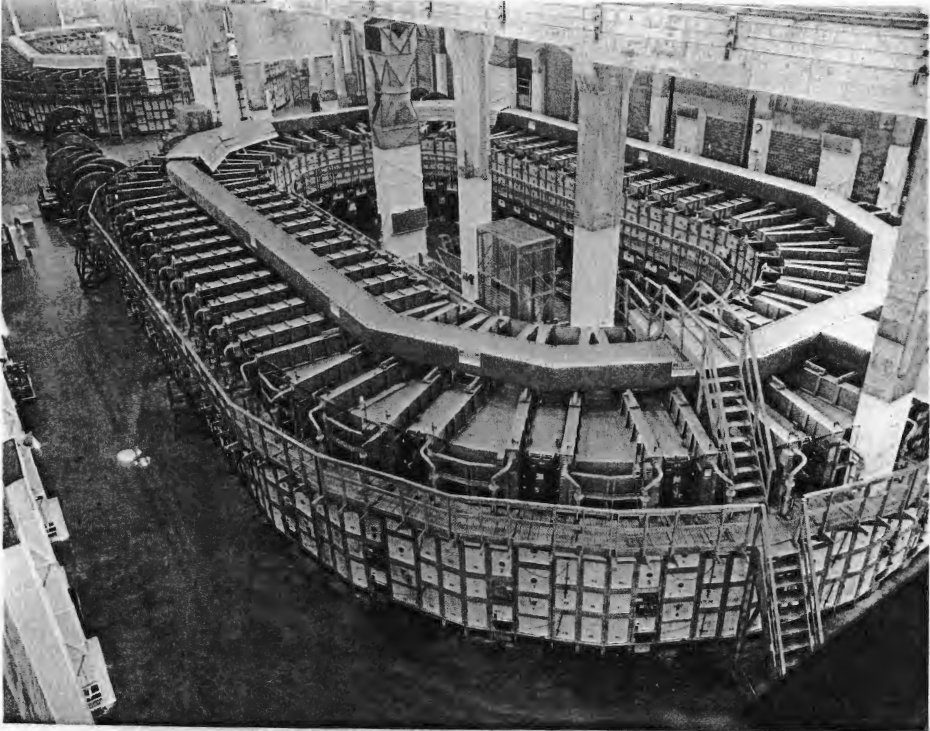
Giant electromagnet Alpha I racetrack for uranium enrichment at Y-12 plant, Oak Ridge, Tennessee, circa 1944–45. The calutrons Lawrence developed are located around the ring.

Tennessee Eastman was hired to manage Y-12. Y-12 initially enriched the uranium-235 content to between 13% and 15%, and shipped the first few hundred grams of it to Los Alamos laboratory in March 1944. Only 1 part in 5,825 of the uranium feed emerged as final product. The rest was splattered over equipment in the process. Strenuous recovery efforts helped raise production to 10% of the uranium-235 feed by January 1945. In February the Alpha racetracks began receiving slightly enriched (1.4%) feed from the new S-50 thermal diffusion plant. The next month it received enhanced (5%) feed from the K-25 gaseous diffusion plant. By April 1945 K-25 was producing uranium sufficiently enriched to feed directly into the Beta tracks.

On July 16, 1945, Lawrence observed the Trinity nuclear test of the first atomic bomb with Chadwick and Charles A. Thomas. Few were more excited at its success than Lawrence. The question of how to use the functional weapon on Japan became an issue for the scientists. While Oppenheimer favored no demonstration of the power of the new weapon to Japanese leaders, Lawrence felt strongly that a demonstration would be wise. When a uranium bomb was used without warning in the atomic bombing of Hiroshima, Lawrence felt great pride in his accomplishment.

Lawrence hoped that the Manhattan Project would develop improved calutrons and construct Alpha III racetracks, but they were judged to be uneconomical. The Alpha tracks were closed down in September 1945. Although performing better than ever, they could not compete with K-25 and the new K-27, which commenced operation in January 1946. In December, the Y-12 plant was closed, thereby cutting the Tennessee Eastman payroll from 8,600 to 1,500 and saving $2 million a month. Staff numbers at the Radiation laboratory fell from 1,086 in May 1945 to 424 by the end of the year.

== Post-war career ==
=== Big Science ===
After the war, Lawrence campaigned extensively for government sponsorship of large scientific programs. He was a forceful advocate of Big Science with its requirements for big machines and big money, and in 1946 he asked the Manhattan Project for over $2 million for research at the Radiation Laboratory (equivalent to $25,000,000 in 2025). Groves approved the money, but cut a number of programs, including Seaborg's proposal for a "hot" radiation laboratory in densely populated Berkeley, and John Lawrence's for production of medical isotopes, because this need could be better met from nuclear reactors. One obstacle was the University of California, which was eager to divest its wartime military obligations. Lawrence and Groves managed to persuade Sproul to accept a contract extension. In 1946, the Manhattan Project spent $7 on physics at the University of California for every dollar spent by the university.

To most of his colleagues, Lawrence appeared to have almost an aversion to mathematical thought. He had a most unusual intuitive approach to involved physical problems, and when explaining new ideas to him, one quickly learned not to befog the issue by writing down the differential equation that might appear to clarify the situation. Lawrence would say something to the effect that he didn't want to be bothered by the mathematical details, but "explain the physics of the problem to me." One could live close to him for years, and think of him as being almost mathematically illiterate, but then be brought up sharply to see how completely he retained his skill in the mathematics of classical electricity and magnetism.

— Luis Alvarez

The 184-inch cyclotron was completed with wartime dollars from the Manhattan Project. It incorporated new ideas by Ed McMillan, and was completed as a synchrocyclotron. It commenced operation on November 13, 1946. For the first time since 1935, Lawrence actively participated in the experiments, working with Eugene Gardner in an unsuccessful attempt to create recently discovered pi mesons with the synchrotron. César Lattes then used the apparatus they had created to find negative pi mesons in 1948.

Responsibility for the national laboratories passed to the newly created Atomic Energy Commission (AEC) on January 1, 1947. That year, Lawrence asked for $15 million for his projects (equivalent to $170,000,000 in 2025), which included a new linear accelerator and a new gigaelectronvolt synchrotron which became known as the bevatron. The University of California's contract to run the Los Alamos laboratory was due to expire on July 1, 1948, and some board members wished to divest the university of the responsibility for running a site outside California. After some negotiation, the university agreed to extend the contract for what had become the Los Alamos National Laboratory for four more years and to appoint Norris Bradbury, who had replaced Oppenheimer as its director in October 1945, as a professor. Soon after, Lawrence received all the funds he had requested.

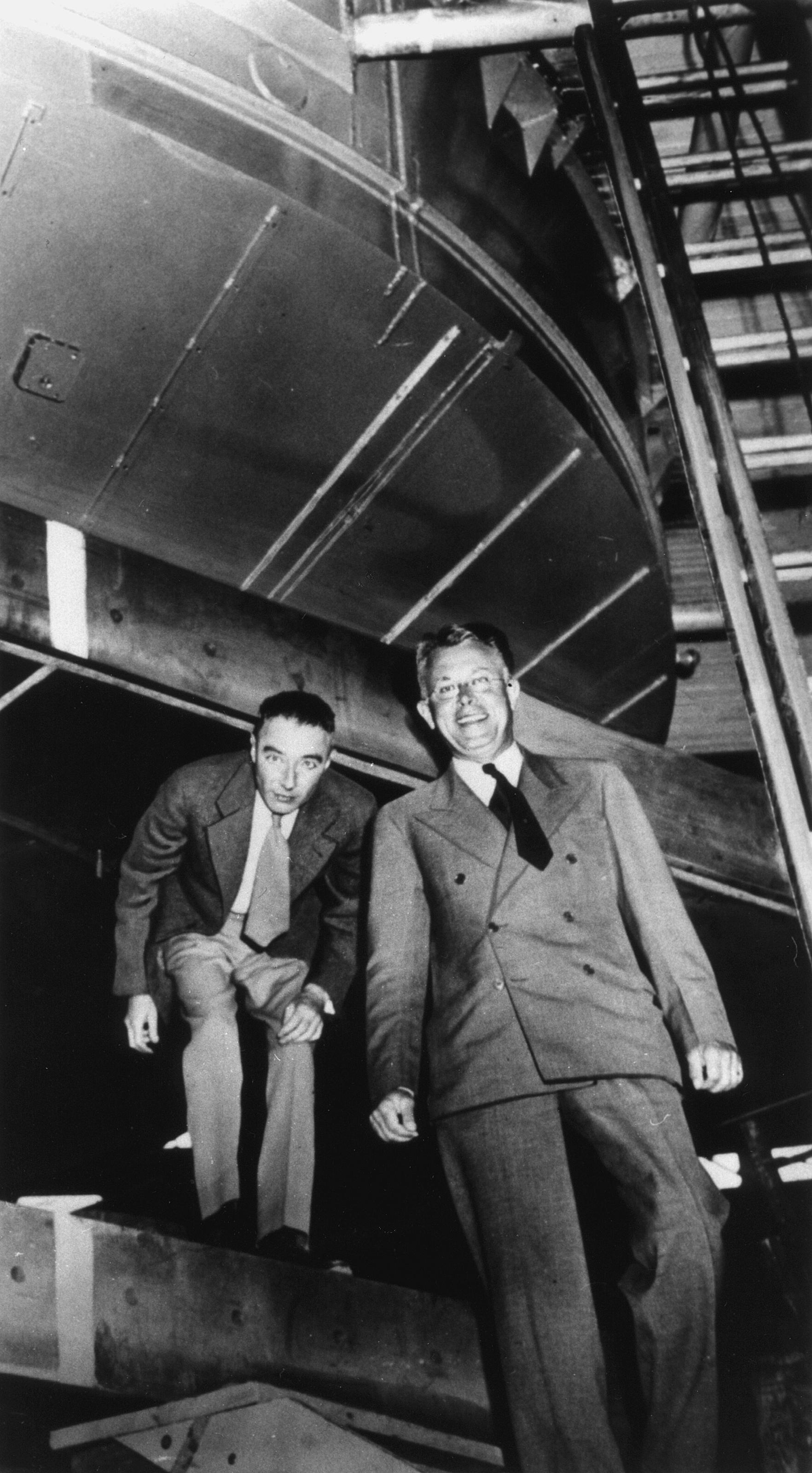
Lawrence (right) with Robert Oppenheimer at the 184-inch cyclotron, circa 1946

At that time, he invented a new type of color television technology in collaboration with UC Berkeley's Chromatic Television Labs. He was awarded multiple patents for the technology he had developed for the project.

Notwithstanding the fact that he voted for Franklin Roosevelt, Lawrence was a Republican, who had strongly disapproved of Oppenheimer's efforts before the war to unionize the Radiation Laboratory workers, which Lawrence considered "leftwandering activities". Lawrence considered political activity to be a waste of time better spent in scientific research, and preferred that it be kept out of the Radiation Laboratory. In the chilly Cold War climate of the post-war University of California, Lawrence accepted the House Committee on Un-American Activities's actions as legitimate, and did not see them as indicative of a systemic problem involving academic freedom or human rights. He was protective of individuals in his laboratory, but even more protective of the reputation of the laboratory. He was forced to defend Radiation Laboratory staff members like Robert Serber who were investigated by the university's Personnel Security Board. In several cases, he issued character references in support of staff. However, Lawrence barred Robert Oppenheimer's brother Frank from the Radiation Laboratory, damaging his relationship with Robert. An acrimonious loyalty oath campaign at the University of California also drove away faculty members. When hearings were held to revoke Robert Oppenheimer's security clearance, Lawrence declined to attend on account of illness, but a transcript in which he was critical of Oppenheimer was presented in his absence. Lawrence's success in building a creative, collaborative laboratory was undermined by the ill-feeling and distrust resulting from political tensions.

=== Thermonuclear weapons ===
Lawrence was alarmed by the Soviet Union's first nuclear test in August 1949. The proper response, he concluded, was an all-out effort to build a bigger nuclear weapon: the hydrogen bomb. He proposed to use accelerators instead of nuclear reactors to produce the neutrons needed to create the tritium the bomb required, as well as plutonium, which was more difficult, as much higher energies would be required. He first proposed the construction of Mark I, a prototype $7 million, 25 MeV linear accelerator, codenamed Materials Test Accelerator (MTA). He was soon talking about a new, even larger MTA known as the Mark II, which could produce tritium or plutonium from depleted uranium-238. Serber and Segrè attempted in vain to explain the technical problems that made it impractical, but Lawrence felt that they were being unpatriotic.

Lawrence strongly backed Edward Teller's campaign for a second nuclear weapons laboratory, which Lawrence proposed to locate with the MTA Mark I at Livermore, California. Lawrence and Teller had to argue their case not only with the Atomic Energy Commission, which did not want it, and the Los Alamos National Laboratory, which was implacably opposed but with proponents who felt that Chicago was the more obvious site for it. The new laboratory at Livermore was finally approved on July 17, 1952, but the Mark II MTA was canceled. By this time, the Atomic Energy Commission had spent $45 million on the Mark I, which had commenced operation, but was mainly used to produce polonium for the nuclear weapons program. Meanwhile, the Brookhaven National Laboratory's Cosmotron had generated a 1 GeV beam.

=== Radiological weapons ===
Lawrence was a staunch advocate of the US offensive radiological weapons program in the immediate post-war period. He was a member of an ad-hoc AEC panel recommending their further study, in which he urged fellow members to not draw comparisons to the more established fields of chemical and biological weapons. He also argued one advantage was their lack of an analogue to the taboo against atomic weapons. Lawrence suggested a fleet of "twenty or thirty" production reactors dedicated to the program, for the weaponized isotope ultimately selected as tantalum-182. This would supplant the B Reactor which was at the time dedicated to plutonium-239 and polonium-210 production for nuclear weapons.

=== Death and legacy ===
In addition to the Nobel Prize, Lawrence received the Elliott Cresson Medal and the Hughes Medal in 1937, the Comstock Prize in Physics in 1938, the Duddell Medal and Prize in 1940, the Holley Medal in 1942, the Medal for Merit in 1946, the William Procter Prize in 1951, Faraday Medal in 1952, and the Enrico Fermi Award from the Atomic Energy Commission in 1957. He was elected a member of the United States National Academy of Sciences in 1934, and both the American Academy of Arts and Sciences and the American Philosophical Society in 1937. He was made an Officer of the Legion d'Honneur in 1948, and was the first recipient of the Sylvanus Thayer Award by the US Military Academy in 1958.

In July 1958, President Dwight D. Eisenhower asked Lawrence to travel to Geneva, Switzerland, to help negotiate a proposed Partial Nuclear Test Ban Treaty with the Soviet Union. AEC Chairman Lewis Strauss had pressed for Lawrence's inclusion. The two men had argued the case for the development of the hydrogen bomb, and Strauss had helped raise funds for Lawrence's cyclotron in 1939. Strauss was keen to have Lawrence as part of the Geneva delegation because Lawrence was known to favor continued nuclear testing. Despite suffering from a serious flare-up of his chronic ulcerative colitis, Lawrence decided to go, but he became ill while in Geneva, and was rushed back to the hospital at Stanford University. Surgeons removed much of his large intestine, but found other problems, including severe atherosclerosis in one of his arteries. He died in Palo Alto Hospital on August 27, 1958, nineteen days after his 57th birthday. Molly did not want a public funeral but agreed to a memorial service at the First Congregational Church in Berkeley. University of California President Clark Kerr delivered the eulogy.

Almost immediately after Lawrence's death, the Regents of the University of California voted to rename two of the university's nuclear research labs after Lawrence: the Lawrence Livermore National Laboratory and the Lawrence Berkeley National Laboratory. The Ernest Orlando Lawrence Award was established in his memory in 1959. Chemical element number 103, discovered at the Lawrence Berkeley National Laboratory in 1961, was named lawrencium after him. In 1968 the Lawrence Hall of Science public science education center was established in his honor. His papers are in the Bancroft Library at the University of California, Berkeley.

In the 1980s, Lawrence's widow petitioned the University of California Board of Regents on several occasions to remove her husband's name from the Lawrence Livermore Laboratory, due to its focus on nuclear weapons Lawrence helped build, but was denied each time. She outlived her husband by more than 44 years and died in Walnut Creek, California, at the age of 92 on January 6, 2003.

George B. Kauffman wrote that:

Before him, "little science" was carried out largely by lone individuals working with modest means on a small scale. After him, massive industrial, and especially governmental, expenditures of manpower and monetary funding made "big science," carried out by large-scale research teams, a major segment of the national economy.

Lawrence is portrayed by Josh Hartnett in Christopher Nolan's 2023 film Oppenheimer.

Awards
Preceded by none	Sylvanus Thayer Award; 1958	Succeeded by John Foster Dulles
