= Electronvolt =

Unit of energy

electronvolt
- Unit system: Non-SI metric unit
- Unit of: energy
- Symbol: eV

Conversions
1 eV in ...	... is equal to ...
- SI units: 1.602176634×10^{−19} J
- CGS units: 1.602176634×10^{−12} erg
- kilowatt-hours: 4.450490650×10^{−26} kWh
- kilocalories (thermochemical): 3.829294058×10^{−23} kcal
- BTUs: 1.518570443×10^{−22} BTU

In physics, an electronvolt (symbol eV), also written as electron-volt and electron volt, is a unit of measurement equivalent to the amount of kinetic energy gained by a single electron accelerating through an electric potential difference of one volt in a vacuum. When used as a unit of energy, the numerical value of 1 eV expressed in unit of joules (symbol J) is equal to the numerical value of the charge of an electron in coulombs (symbol C). Under the 2019 revision of the SI, this sets 1 eV equal to the exact value 1.602176634×10^{−19} J. Historically, the electronvolt was devised as a standard unit of measure through its usefulness in electrostatic particle accelerator sciences, because a particle with electric charge q gains an energy E = qV after passing through a voltage of V.

== Definition and use ==
An electronvolt is the amount of energy gained or lost by a single electron when it moves through an electric potential difference of one volt. Hence, it has a value of one volt, which is 1 J/C, multiplied by the elementary charge e = 1.602176634×10^{−19} C. Therefore, one electronvolt is equal to 1.602176634×10^{−19} J.

The electronvolt (eV) is a unit of energy, but is not an SI unit. It is a commonly used unit of energy within physics, widely used in solid state, atomic, nuclear and particle physics, and high-energy astrophysics. It is commonly used with SI prefixes milli- (10^{−3}), kilo- (10^{3}), mega- (10^{6}), giga- (10^{9}), tera- (10^{12}), peta- (10^{15}), exa- (10^{18}), zetta- (10^{21}), yotta- (10^{24}), ronna- (10^{27}), or quetta- (10^{30}), the respective symbols being meV, keV, MeV, GeV, TeV, PeV, EeV, ZeV, YeV, ReV, and QeV. The SI unit of energy is the joule (J).

In some older documents, and in the name Bevatron, the symbol BeV is used, where the B stands for billion. The symbol BeV is therefore equivalent to GeV, though neither is an SI unit.

== Relation to other physical properties and units ==
Quantity	Unit	SI value of unit
energy	eV	1.602176634×10^{−19} J
mass	eV/c^{2}	1.7826619216279×10^{−36} kg
momentum	eV/c	5.3442859926783×10^{−28} kg·m/s
temperature	eV/k_{B}	11604.51812155 K
time	ħ/eV	6.5821195695091×10^{−16} s
distance	ħc/eV	1.973269804593×10^{−7} m

In the fields of physics in which the electronvolt is used, other quantities are typically measured using units derived from it; products with fundamental constants of importance in the theory are often used.

=== Mass ===
By mass–energy equivalence, the electronvolt corresponds to a unit of mass. It is common in particle physics, where units of mass and energy are often interchanged, to express mass in units of eV/c^{2}, where c is the speed of light in vacuum (from E = mc^{2}). It is common to informally express mass in terms of eV as a unit of mass, effectively using a system of natural units with c set to 1. The kilogram equivalent of 1 eV/c^{2} is:

$$1\; \text{eV}/c^2 = \frac{1.602\ 176\ 634 \times 10^{-19} \, \text{kg} \cdot \text{m}^2 \cdot \text{s}^{-2}}{(299\ 792\ 458\; \mathrm{m/s})^2} = 1.782\ 661\ 92 \times 10^{-36}\; \text{kg}.$$

For example, an electron and a positron, each with a mass of 0.511 MeV/c^{2}, can annihilate to yield 1.022 MeV of energy. A proton has a mass of 0.938 GeV/c^{2}. In general, the masses of all hadrons are of the order of 1 GeV/c^{2}, which makes the GeV/c^{2} a convenient unit of mass for particle physics:

1 GeV/c^{2} = 1.78266192×10^{−27} kg.

The atomic mass constant (m_{u}), one twelfth of the mass a carbon-12 atom, is close to the mass of a proton. To convert to electronvolt mass-equivalent, use the formula:

m_{u} = 1 Da = 931.4941 MeV/c^{2} = 0.9314941 GeV/c^{2}.

=== Momentum ===
By dividing a particle's kinetic energy in electronvolts by the fundamental constant c (the speed of light), one can describe the particle's momentum in units of eV/c. In natural units in which the fundamental velocity constant c is numerically 1, the c may informally be omitted to express momentum using the unit electronvolt.

The energy–momentum relation in natural units, $E^2 = p^2 + m_0^2$, is a Pythagorean equation that can be visualized as a right triangle where the total energy $E$ is the hypotenuse and the momentum $p$ and rest mass $m_0$ are the two legs.

The energy–momentum relation
$$E^2 = p^2 c^2 + m_0^2 c^4$$
in natural units (with $c=1$)
$$E^2 = p^2 + m_0^2$$
is a Pythagorean equation. When a relatively high energy is applied to a particle with relatively low rest mass, it can be approximated as $E \simeq p$ in high-energy physics such that an applied energy with expressed in the unit eV conveniently results in a numerically approximately equivalent change of momentum when expressed with the unit eV/c.

The dimension of momentum is T^{−1}LM. The dimension of energy is T^{−2}L^{2}M. Dividing a unit of energy (such as eV) by a fundamental constant (such as the speed of light) that has the dimension of velocity (T^{−1}L) facilitates the required conversion for using a unit of energy to quantify momentum.

For example, if the momentum p of an electron is 1 GeV/c, then the conversion to MKS system of units can be achieved by:
$$\begin{align}
p = 1\; \text{GeV}/c &= \frac{10^9 \times (1.602\ 176\ 634 \times 10^{-19} \; \text{C}) \times (1 \; \text{V})}{2.99\ 792\ 458 \times 10^8\; \text{m}/\text{s}} \\[1ex]
&= 5.344\ 286 \times 10^{-19}\; \text{kg} {\cdot} \text{m}/\text{s}.
\end{align}$$

=== Distance ===
In particle physics, a system of natural units in which the speed of light in vacuum c and the reduced Planck constant ħ are dimensionless and equal to unity is widely used: c = ħ = 1. In these units, both distances and times are expressed in inverse energy units (while energy and mass are expressed in the same units, see mass–energy equivalence). In particular, particle scattering lengths are often presented using a unit of inverse particle mass.

Outside this system of units, the conversion factors between electronvolt, second, and nanometer are the following:
$$\hbar = 1.054\ 571\ 817\ 646\times 10^{-34}\ \mathrm{J{\cdot}s} = 6.582\ 119\ 569\ 509\times 10^{-16}\ \mathrm{eV{\cdot}s}.$$

The above relations also allow expressing the mean lifetime τ of an unstable particle (in seconds) in terms of its decay width Γ (in eV) via Γ = ħ/τ. For example, the B^{0} meson has a lifetime of 1.530(9) picoseconds, mean decay length is cτ = 459.7 μm, or a decay width of 4.302(25)×10^{−4} eV.

Conversely, the tiny meson mass differences responsible for meson oscillations are often expressed in the more convenient inverse picoseconds.

Energy in electronvolts is sometimes expressed through the wavelength of light with photons of the same energy:
$$\frac{1\; \text{eV}}{hc} = \frac{1.602\ 176\ 634 \times 10^{-19} \; \text{J}}{(6.62\ 607\ 015 \times 10^{-34}\; \text{J} {\cdot} \text{s}) \times (2.99\ 792\ 458 \times 10^{11}\; \text{mm}/\text{s})} \thickapprox 806.55439 \; \text{mm}^{-1}.$$

=== Temperature ===
In certain fields, such as plasma physics, it is convenient to use the electronvolt to express temperature. The electronvolt is divided by the Boltzmann constant to convert to the Kelvin scale:
$${1 \,\mathrm{eV} / k_{\text{B}}} = {1.602\ 176\ 634 \times 10^{-19} \text{ J} \over 1.380\ 649 \times 10^{-23} \text{ J/K}} = 11\ 604.518\ 12 \text{ K},$$
where k_{B} is the Boltzmann constant.

The k_{B} is assumed when using the electronvolt to express temperature, for example, a typical magnetic confinement fusion plasma is 15 keV (kiloelectronvolt), which corresponds to 174 MK (megakelvin).

As an approximation: at a temperature of T = 20 °C, k_{B}T is about 0.025 eV (≈ (290 K)/(11604 K/eV)).

=== Wavelength ===
Energy of photons in the visible spectrum in eV

Graph of wavelength (nm) to energy (eV)

The energy E, frequency ν, and wavelength λ of a photon are related by
$$E = h\nu = \frac{hc}{\lambda}
= \frac{\mathrm{4.135\ 667\ 696 \times 10^{-15}\;eV/Hz} \times \mathrm{299\, 792\, 458\;m/s}}{\lambda}$$
where h is the Planck constant, c is the speed of light. This reduces to
$$\begin{align}
E
&= 4.135\ 667\ 696 \times 10^{-15}\;\mathrm{eV/Hz}\times\nu \\[4pt]
&=\frac{1\ 239.841\ 98\;\mathrm{eV{\cdot}nm}}{\lambda}.
\end{align}$$
A photon with a wavelength of 532 nm (green light) would have an energy of approximately 2.33 eV. Similarly, 1 eV would correspond to an infrared photon of wavelength 1240 nm or frequency 241.8 THz.

== Scattering experiments ==
In a low-energy nuclear scattering experiment, it is conventional to refer to the nuclear recoil energy in units of eVr, keVr, etc. This distinguishes the nuclear recoil energy from the "electron equivalent" recoil energy (eVee, keVee, etc.) measured by scintillation light. For example, the yield of a phototube is measured in phe/keVee (photoelectrons per keV electron-equivalent energy). The relationship between eV, eVr, and eVee depends on the medium the scattering takes place in, and must be established empirically for each material.

== Energy comparisons ==
Photon frequency vs. energy particle in electronvolts. The energy of a photon varies only with the frequency of the photon, related by the speed of light. This contrasts with a massive particle of which the energy depends on its velocity and rest mass. Legend: γ: gamma rays / MIR: mid-infrared / HF: high freq.; HX: hard X-rays / FIR: far infrared / MF: medium freq.; SX: soft X-rays / radio waves / LF: low freq.; EUV: extreme ultraviolet / EHF: extremely high freq. / VLF: very low freq.; NUV: near ultraviolet / SHF: super high freq. / ULF: ultra-low freq.; visible light / UHF: ultra high freq. / SLF: super low freq.; NIR: near infrared / VHF: very high freq. / ELF: extremely low freq.

Energy	Source
10 YeV	approximate grand unification energy
120 PeV	the highest-energy neutrino detected by the KM3NeT neutrino telescope
14 TeV	designed proton center-of-mass collision energy at the Large Hadron Collider (operated at 3.5 TeV since its start on 30 March 2010, reached 13 TeV in May 2015)
125.1±0.2 GeV	rest mass energy of the Higgs boson, as measured by two separate detectors at the LHC to a certainty better than 5 sigma
105.7 MeV	rest mass energy of a muon
0.511 MeV	rest mass energy of an electron
13.6 eV	energy required to ionize atomic hydrogen; molecular bond energies are on the order of 1 eV to 10 eV per bond
1.65 to 3.26 eV	range of photon energy $(\tfrac{hc}{\lambda})$ of visible spectrum from red to violet
38 meV	average kinetic energy, 3/2k_{B}T, of one gas molecule at room temperature
230 μeV	thermal energy, k_{B}T, at the cosmic microwave background radiation temperature of ~2.7 kelvin

=== Molar energy ===
One mole of particles given 1 eV of energy each has approximately 96.5 kJ of energy – this corresponds to the Faraday constant (F ≈ 96485 C⋅mol^{−1}), where the energy in joules of n moles of particles each with energy E eV is equal to E·F·n.

== See also ==
- Orders of magnitude (energy)
