= Rest frame =

Frame of reference in which a specified particle is at rest

In special relativity, the rest frame of a particle is the frame of reference (a coordinate system attached to physical markers) in which the particle is at rest.

The rest frame of compound objects (such as a fluid, or a solid made of many vibrating atoms) is taken to be the frame of reference in which the average momentum of the particles which make up the substance is zero (the particles may individually have momentum, but collectively have no net momentum). The rest frame of a container of gas, for example, would be the rest frame of the container itself, in which the gas molecules are not at rest, but are no more likely to be traveling in one direction than another. The rest frame of a river would be the frame of an unpowered boat, in which the mean velocity of the water is zero. This frame is also called the center-of-mass frame, or center-of-momentum frame.

The center-of-momentum frame is notable for being the reference frame in which the total energy (total relativistic energy) of a particle or compound object, is also the invariant mass (times the scale-factor speed of light squared). It is also the reference frame in which the object or system has minimum total energy.

In both special relativity and general relativity it is essential to specify the rest frame of any time measurements, as the time that an event occurred is dependent on the rest frame of the observer. For this reason the timings of astronomical events such as supernovae are usually recorded in terms of when the light from the event reached Earth, as the "real time" that the event occurred depends on the rest frame chosen. For example, in the rest frame of a neutrino particle travelling from the Crab Nebula supernova to Earth, the supernova occurred in the 11th Century AD only a short while before the light reached Earth, but in Earth's rest frame the event occurred about 6300 years earlier.

== See also ==
- Co-moving frame
- Mass-energy equivalence
