= Energy–momentum relation =

Relativistic equation relating total energy to mass and momentum

In physics, the energy–momentum relation, or relativistic dispersion relation, is the relativistic equation relating total energy (also called relativistic energy) to mass (also called invariant mass or rest mass) and momentum. It is the extension of mass–energy equivalence for bodies or systems with non-zero momentum.

It can be formulated as

$E^2 = (pc)^2 + \left(mc^2\right)^2\,.$

1

Einstein Triangle

This equation holds for a body or system, such as one or more particles, with total energy E, mass m, and momentum of magnitude p; the constant c is the speed of light. It assumes the special relativity case of flat spacetime and that the particles are free. Total energy is the sum of rest energy E_{0} = mc^{2} and relativistic kinetic energy:
$$E_\text{K} = E - E_0 = \sqrt{(pc)^2 + \left(mc^2\right)^2} - mc^2\,.$$

The Dirac sea model, which was used to predict the existence of antimatter, is closely related to the energy–momentum relation.

== Origins and derivation of the equation ==
The energy–momentum relation goes back to Max Planck's article published in 1906. It was used by Walter Gordon in 1926 and then by Paul Dirac in 1928 under the form $E = \sqrt{c^2 p^2 + \left(m c^2\right)^2} + V$, where V is the potential energy.

The equation can be derived in a number of ways. The simplest include the following:

1. Considering the relativistic dynamics of a massive particle, or
2. Evaluating the norm of the four-momentum of the particle. This method applies to both massive and massless particles, and can be extended to multi-particle systems with relatively little effort: see § Many-particle systems.

=== Heuristic approach for massive particles ===
For a massive object moving at speed v in the lab frame, the total energy E of the object is given in the lab frame as
$$E=\gamma mc^2\,.$$
The three dimensional relativistic momentum p of the object in the lab frame has the following magnitude p:
$$p = \gamma mv\,.$$
These quantities include the Lorentz factor γ:
$$\gamma = \frac{1}{\sqrt{1 - \left(\frac{v}{c}\right)^2}}\,.$$
Squaring the magnitude of the three-momentum gives
$$p^2 = \frac{m^2 v^2}{1 - \left(\frac{v}{c}\right)^2}\,.$$
Solving for v^{2} and substituting into the Lorentz factor, one obtains its alternative form in terms of 3-momentum and mass, rather than 3-velocity:
$$\gamma = \sqrt{1 + \left(\frac{p}{m c}\right)^2}\,.$$
Inserting this form of the Lorentz factor into the energy equation gives
$$E = mc^2\sqrt{1 + \left(\frac{p}{m c}\right)^2}\,.$$
Squaring both sides and rearranging yields the standard form (1).

This approach is not applicable to massless particles due to issues detailed in § Massless particles.

=== Norm of the four-momentum ===
The energy and momentum of an object measured in two inertial frames in energy–momentum space – the yellow frame measures E and p while the blue frame measures E′ and p′. The green arrow is the four-momentum P of an object with length proportional to its mass m. The green frame is the centre-of-momentum frame for the object with energy equal to the rest energy. The hyperbolae show the Lorentz transformation from one frame to another is a hyperbolic rotation, and Φ and Φ + η are the rapidities of the blue and green frames, respectively.

==== Special relativity ====
In Minkowski space, energy (divided by c) and momentum are two components of a Minkowski four-vector, namely the four-momentum:
$$\mathbf{P} = \left(\frac{E}{c}, \mathbf{p}\right)\,$$
(these are the contravariant components).

The Minkowski inner product ⟨⋅, ⋅⟩ of this vector with itself gives the square of the norm of this vector, which is proportional to the square of the mass m of the body:
$$\left\langle\mathbf{P}, \mathbf{P}\right\rangle = |\mathbf{P}|^2 = \left(m c\right)^2\,.$$
This is a Lorentz invariant quantity, and therefore independent of the frame of reference. Using the Minkowski metric η with metric signature (+ − − −), the inner product is
$$\begin{align}
\left\langle\mathbf{P},\mathbf{P}\right\rangle
&= P^\alpha\eta_{\alpha\beta}P^\beta \\
&=
\begin{pmatrix}
\frac{E}{c} & p_x & p_y & p_z
\end{pmatrix}
\begin{pmatrix}
1 & 0 & 0 & 0 \\
0 & -1 & 0 & 0 \\
0 & 0 & -1 & 0 \\
0 & 0 & 0 & -1 \\
\end{pmatrix}
\begin{pmatrix}
\frac{E}{c} \\ p_x \\ p_y \\ p_z
\end{pmatrix} \\
&= \left(\frac{E}{c}\right)^2 - p^2\,,
\end{align}$$
so
$$\left(m c\right)^2 = \left(\frac{E}{c}\right)^2 - p^2\,.$$

==== General relativity ====
In general relativity, the four-momentum is a four-vector defined in a local coordinate frame, although by definition the inner product is similar to that of special relativity,
$$\left\langle\mathbf{P},\mathbf{P}\right\rangle = |\mathbf{P}|^2 = \left(m c\right)^2\,,$$
in which the Minkowski metric η is replaced by the metric tensor field g:
$$\left\langle\mathbf{P}, \mathbf{P}\right\rangle = \left|\mathbf{P}\right|^2 = P^\alpha g_{\alpha\beta}P^\beta \,,$$
solved from the Einstein field equations. Then
$$P^\alpha g_{\alpha\beta}P^\beta = \left(m c\right)^2\,.$$

== Special cases ==
=== Centre-of-momentum frame (one particle) ===
For a body in its rest frame, the momentum is zero, so the energy-momentum relation (1) reduces to
$$E = E_0 = mc^2 \,,$$
where E_{0} denotes the rest energy of the body.

=== Massless particles ===
If the object has mass $m=0$, as is the case for a photon, then the energy-momentum relation (1) reduces to
$$E = pc\,.$$

Massless particles also have constant speed $v=c$. This has consequences for the Lorentz factor γ,
$$\gamma = \frac{1}{\sqrt{1 - \left(\frac{v}{c}\right)^2}} = \frac{1}{0}\,,$$
which in turn gives indeterminate forms to some formulas involving this factor:

$$\begin{align}
E = \gamma mc^2 &= \frac{0}{0}\,,\quad\text{and}\\[1ex]
p = \gamma mv &= \frac{0}{0}\,.
\end{align}$$

The workaround for these indeterminate forms for energy and momentum lies in the de Broglie relations, discussed in § Photons.

=== Classical correspondence ===
Rewriting the energy-momentum relation (1) for massive particles
$$E = mc^2 \sqrt{1 + \left(\frac{p}{mc}\right)^2}\,,$$
and expanding into power series by the binomial theorem (or a Taylor series) around $\left(\frac{p}{mc}\right)^2 = 0$,
$$E = mc^2 \left[1 + \frac{1}{2}\left(\frac{p}{mc}\right)^2 - \frac{1}{8}\left(\frac{p}{mc}\right)^4 + \cdots \right]\,.$$
In the limit that v ≪ c, we have γ ≈ 1 so the momentum has the classical form p ≈ mv. Then to first order in $\left(\frac{p}{mc}\right)^2$ we have
$$\begin{align}
E &\approx mc^2 \left[1 + \frac{1}{2}\left(\frac{mv}{mc}\right)^2 \right]\,,\quad\text{or}\\[1ex]
E &\approx mc^2 + \frac{1}{2} mv^2 \,,
\end{align}$$
where the first term is the rest energy E_{0} and the second term is the classical kinetic energy.

This approximation is not valid for massless particles, since the expansion required the division of momentum by mass. Incidentally, there are no massless particles in classical mechanics.

=== Tachyons and exotic matter ===
Particles of ordinary matter must have positive mass m > 0 and subluminal speed v < c, yielding the usual relativistic energy–momentum relation (1). Massless particles are a marginal case where m = 0 and v = c, requiring special treatment discussed in § Massless particles. However, we can hypothesize about forms of matter that exceed these mass and speed restrictions in other ways.

Hyphothetical tachyons are particles that would move exclusively at superluminal speeds v > c, and whose energy–momentum relation would be
$$E^2 = (pc)^2 - \left(mc^2\right)^2\,.$$

Hypothetical exotic matter particles would have negative mass m < 0, resulting in yet another form of the energy–momentum relation:
$$E^2 = -(pc)^2 + \left(mc^2\right)^2\,.$$

== Many-particle systems ==
=== Addition of four-momenta ===
Consider a system of many particles with relativistic momenta p_{n} and energy E_{n} measured in a particular frame, where n simply labels the particles n = 1, 2, ... up to the total number of particles. The four-momenta in this frame can be added:
$$\sum_n \mathbf{P}_n = \sum_n \left(\frac{E_n}{c} , \mathbf{p}_n\right) = \left( \sum_n \frac{E_n}{c}, \sum_n \mathbf{p}_n \right)\,.$$
Taking the norm obtains the energy-momentum relation for the whole system:
$$\left|\left(\sum_n \mathbf{P}_n \right)\right|^2 = \left(\sum_n \frac{E_n}{c}\right)^2 - \left(\sum_n \mathbf{p}_n\right)^2 = \left(Mc\right)^2\,.$$
Here M is the total mass of the system, and is not equal to the sum of the individual masses of the particles unless all particles are at rest (see Mass in special relativity § The mass of composite systems for more detail). Substituting and rearranging gives the generalization of (1);

$\left(\sum_n E_n \right)^2 = \left(\sum_n \mathbf{p}_n c\right)^2 + \left(Mc^2\right)^2\,.$

2

The energies and momenta in the equation are all frame-dependent, while M is frame-independent.

=== Centre-of-momentum frame ===
In the centre-of-momentum frame, by definition we have
$$\sum_n \mathbf{p}_n = \boldsymbol{0}\,,$$
with the implication from (2) that the total energy of the center-of-momentum frame is the total mass M multiplied by c^{2}:
$$\left(\sum_n E_n \right)^2 = \left(Mc^2\right)^2 \Rightarrow \sum_n E_{\mathrm{COM}\,n} = E_\mathrm{COM} = Mc^2 \,.$$
This is true in all reference frames since M is invariant.

The energies E_{COM n} are those in the centre-of-momentum frame, not the lab frame. However, for many familiar bound systems the centre-of-momentum frame is the lab frame: if the system itself is not in motion, the individual momenta must add to zero. For example, when placing a container of gas on a scale, there is internal energy in the vibration of atoms in the container walls, and in the kinetic motion of the gas molecules. Because the container is at rest relative to the scale, all of these energies read as mass.

=== Relating total mass to individual masses ===
Either the energies or momenta of the particles, as measured in some frame, can be eliminated using the energy-momentum relation for each particle,
$$E^2_n - \left(\mathbf{p}_n c\right)^2 = \left(m_n c^2\right)^2 \,,$$
allowing the total mass M to be expressed either in terms of individual energies and masses, or individual momenta and masses. In a particular frame, the squares of sums can be rewritten as sums of squares (and products):
$$\begin{align}
\left(\sum_n E_n \right)^2
&= \left(\sum_n E_n \right)\left(\sum_k E_k \right) \\[1ex]
&= \sum_{n,k} E_n E_k
= 2\sum_{n<k} E_n E_k + \sum_n E_n^2\,,
\end{align}$$
$$\begin{align}
\left(\sum_n \mathbf{p}_n \right)^2
&= \left(\sum_n \mathbf{p}_n \right)\cdot\left(\sum_k \mathbf{p}_k \right) \\[1ex]
&= \sum_{n,k} \mathbf{p}_n \cdot \mathbf{p}_k
= 2\sum_{n<k} \mathbf{p}_n \cdot \mathbf{p}_k + \sum_{n}\mathbf{p}_n^2\,,
\end{align}$$
so substituting the sums, we can introduce the individual masses m_{n} in (2):
$$\sum_n \left(m_n c^2\right)^2 + 2\sum_{n<k}\left(E_n E_k - c^2 \mathbf{p}_n \cdot \mathbf{p}_k\right) = \left(Mc^2\right)^2 \,.$$

The energies can be eliminated by substituting for E_{n} and E_{k} using
$$\begin{align}
E_n &= \sqrt{\left(\mathbf{p}_n c\right)^2 + \left(m_n c^2\right)^2}\, \quad\text{and}\\[1.5ex]
E_k &= \sqrt{\left(\mathbf{p}_k c\right)^2 + \left(m_k c^2\right)^2}\,.
\end{align}$$
Alternatively, the momenta can be eliminated by substituting for p_{n} · p_{k} using
$$\begin{align}
\mathbf{p}_n \cdot \mathbf{p}_k &= \left|\mathbf{p}_n\right| \left|\mathbf{p}_k\right| \cos\theta_{nk}\,, \\[1.5ex]
\left|\mathbf{p}_n\right| &= \frac{1}{c}\sqrt{E_n^2 - \left(m_n c^2\right)^2}\, \quad\text{and}\\[1.5ex]
\left|\mathbf{p}_k\right| &= \frac{1}{c}\sqrt{E_k^2 - \left(m_k c^2\right)^2}\,,
\end{align}$$
where θ_{nk} is the angle between the momentum vectors p_{n} and p_{k}.

Rearranging:
$$\left(Mc^2\right)^2 -\sum_n \left(m_n c^2\right)^2 = 2\sum_{n<k}\left(E_n E_k - c^2 \mathbf{p}_n \cdot \mathbf{p}_k\right) \,.$$

Since the total mass M of the system and the individual masses m_{n} of the particles are all invariants, the right hand side is also an invariant, even though the energies and momenta are all measured in a particular frame.

== Relation to quantum theory ==
Central to the quantum treatment of both massive and massless particles are the de Broglie relations,
$$\begin{align}
E &= h\nu = \hbar\omega\,,\\[1ex]
\mathbf{p} &= \hbar\mathbf{k}\,\quad\text{and}\\[1ex]
p &= \frac{h}{\lambda}\,,
\end{align}$$
where h is the Planck constant; ν is the frequency; ħ is the reduced Planck constant h/2π; ω is the angular frequency; k is the wavevector, whose magnitude is the wavenumber k; and λ is the wavelength.

=== Matter waves ===
The energy–momentum relation (1) can be expressed in terms of wave quantities:
$$\left(\hbar\omega\right)^2 = \left(\hbar ck\right)^2 + \left(mc^2\right)^2 \,.$$
Dividing by (ħc)^{2} throughout,

$\left(\frac{\omega}{c}\right)^2 = k^2 + \left(\frac{mc}{\hbar}\right)^2 \,.$

3

This can also be derived from the magnitude of the four-wavevector
$$\mathbf{K} = \left(\frac{\omega}{c}, \mathbf{k}\right)\,,$$
in a similar way to the four-momentum in § Norm of the four-momentum.

=== Photons ===
As mentioned in § Massless particles, photons have mass m = 0 and a simplified energy-momentum relation E = pc. Substituting the de Broglie momentum
$$p = \frac{h}{\lambda} = \hbar k\,,$$
we get
$$E = \frac{hc}{\lambda} = \hbar ck \,.$$
The de Broglie energy also applies directly:
$$E = h\nu = \hbar\omega \,.$$
The same relations would apply to any other massless particle.

=== Relativistic wave equations ===
In the history of relativistic quantum mechanics, the energy-momentum relation (1) was the basis for constructing relativistic wave equations, ultimately leading to the development of the Dirac equation, which incorporates the concepts of antimatter and spin. In quantum field theory, the relativistic energy-momentum relation applies to all particles and fields.

== Units of energy, mass and momentum ==
=== Natural units ===
In natural units where c = 1, the energy–momentum relation (1) reduces to
$$E^2 = p^2 + m^2 \,.$$
One way to conceptualize this system is through units of distance such as the light-year or light-second.

Choosing natural units where ħ = c = 1 simplifies the wavenumber relation (3) to
$$\omega^2 = k^2 + m^2 \,.$$

The resulting formulas, although simpler in appearance, only work for this particular choice of units. After much manipulation, it can be challenging to re-insert the appropriate constants to revert to a universal form.

=== Particle physics units ===
In particle physics, energy is typically given in units of electronvolts (eV), momenta are expressed in eV/c, and masses in eV/c^{2}.

In informal contexts, mass is sometimes conflated with rest energy and given in eV (possibly implying some version of natural units). For example, if a proton is referred to as having a "mass" of 938 MeV, in context this means MeV/c^{2}.

=== Mass-equivalent ===
Energy may also be given in mass-equivalent units such as grams (strictly speaking grams·c^{2}), thereby illustrating the mass defect in especially powerful releases of energy. For example, the first atomic bomb liberated about 1 gram of heat, and the largest thermonuclear bombs have generated a kilogram or more of heat.

This is not to be confused with TNT equivalent units such as kilotons or megatons: those units refer to the energy released by detonating a specified mass of the explosive TNT, rather than the energy itself being scaled into mass units by a factor of 1/c^{2}.

== Alternate conventions for mass ==
The familiar mass–energy relation E = mc^{2} can be seen as a special case of the energy-momentum relation (1) where the momentum p = 0, and the total energy E equals the rest energy E_{0}:
$$E_0 = m c^2\,.$$
Alternatively, a relativistic mass m_{rel} may be defined that varies with the frame of reference and increases in proportion to the total energy, and must be contrasted with the invariant mass m_{0}:
$$\begin{align}
E &= m_{\mathrm{rel}} c^2\,\quad\text{and}\\[1ex]
E_0 &= m_0 c^2\,,
\end{align}$$
where the two are related as follows:
$$m_{\mathrm{rel}} = \gamma m_0\,.$$
In different sources, either of these quantities might be denoted as m depending on context and the author's preference.

Elsewhere in this article, the term 'mass' and the symbol m refer exclusively to invariant mass, and relativistic mass is not used. The total energy E can be used instead to illustrate the relevant concepts.

== See also ==
- Mass–energy equivalence
- Four-momentum
- Mass in special relativity
