= Com =

Com or COM may refer to:

== Computing ==
- COM (hardware interface), a serial port interface on IBM PC-compatible computers
- COM file, or .com file, short for "command", a file extension for an executable file in MS-DOS
- .com, an Internet top-level domain, originally short for "commercial"
- Component Object Model, a Microsoft software interface technology
- Computer-on-module, a type of single-board computer

== Transport ==
- Comair (United States), an airline which was a wholly owned subsidiary of Delta Air Lines by ICAO airline designator

== Other ==
- Calcium oxalate monohydrate, the mineral whewellite and a common component of kidney stones
- COM (manga magazine)
- Cốm, green rice dish in Vietnam
- Common rail (electricity), a common path of currents in an electronic circuit, often for the ground
- Center of mass
- Center-of-momentum frame
- Coma Berenices (constellation), standard astronomical abbreviation
- Comoros, ISO 3166-1 alpha-3 country code
- Boston University College of Communication
- College of Marin, a community college in Marin County, California
- College of the Mainland, a community college in Texas City, Texas
- Collectivité d'outre-mer, a French overseas collectivity, or first-order administrative division
- Concerned Officers Movement, anti-war organization
- Commander of the Order of Merit of the Police Forces, Canadian decoration post-nominal letters
- Either of two figures named Com in the Book of Mormon: an early Jaredite king, son of Coriantum; and a late Jaredite king
- Como, a city and comune in Lombardy, Italy, in Romansh language
- The Com, a cybercriminal network

== See also ==
- Comm (disambiguation)
- Command (disambiguation)
- dot-com (disambiguation)
