= Energy–momentum =

Energy–momentum may refer to:

- Four-momentum
- Stress–energy tensor
- Energy–momentum relation
