= Common rail (disambiguation) =

Common rail may refer to:

- Common rail direct fuel injection
- Common rail (electricity)
- Common rail drinks
