= Breit frame =

Frame of reference used in particle physics

In particle physics, the Breit frame (also known as infinite-momentum frame or IMF) is a frame of reference used to describe scattering experiments of the form $\textstyle A + B \rightarrow A + \sum C_i$, that is experiments in which particle $A$ scatters off particle $B$, possibly producing particles $C_i$ in the process. The frame is defined so that the particle A has its momentum reversed in the scattering process.

Another way of understanding the Breit frame is to look at the elastic scattering $A+\gamma \rightarrow A'$. The Breit frame is defined as the frame in which $\vec{p}_A+\vec{p}_{A'}=0$. There are different occasions when Breit frame can be useful, e.g., in measuring the electromagnetic form factor of a hadron, $A$ is the scattered hadron; while for deep inelastic scattering process, the elastically scattered parton should be considered as $A$. It is only in the latter case the Breit frame gets related to infinite-momentum frame.

It is named after the American physicist Gregory Breit.

== See also ==
- Center-of-momentum frame
- Laboratory frame of reference
