= Comm (disambiguation) =

COMM, Comm or comm may also refer to:

Comm may also refer to:

- comm, POSIX command
- "Comm.", the standard botanical abbreviation for scientist Philibert Commerson
- "comm.", an abbreviation for commentary
- COMM (The Tangent album)
- ComM, abbreviation used to signify the Comendador/Comendadeira grade of the Portuguese Order of Merit
- comm, shorthand for Communication
- Abbreviation of communism

== See also ==
- Com (disambiguation)
