= Gregory Breit =

American physicist (1899–1981)

- Григорій Брейт
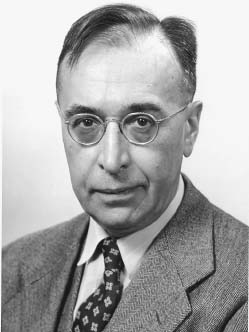
- Photograph of Gregory Breit
- Born: Gregory Abramovich Schneider; July 14, 1899; Mykolaiv, Kherson Governorate, Russian Empire (now Mykolaiv, Ukraine)
- Died: September 13, 1981 (aged 82); Salem, Oregon, US
- Education: Johns Hopkins University
- Known for: Relativistic Breit–Wigner distribution; Breit equation; Breit frame; Breit–Rabi formula; Breit–Wheeler process; Zitterbewegung
- Awards: Franklin Medal (1964); National Medal of Science (1967); Tom W. Bonner Prize in Nuclear Physics (1969)
- Scientific career
- Fields: Physics
- Workplaces: Leiden University; University of Minnesota; New York University; University of Wisconsin; Yale University
- Doctoral advisor: Joseph S. Ames
- Doctoral students: Hubert Mack Thaxton; Charles Kittel

Gregory Breit (Ukrainian: Григорій Абрамовіч Шнайдер, Russian: Григорий Абрамович Шнайдер, romanized: Grigory Abramovich Shneider; July 14, 1899 – September 13, 1981) was an American physicist born in Mykolaiv, Russian Empire (now Mykolaiv, Ukraine). He was a professor at New York University (1929–1934), University of Wisconsin–Madison (1934–1947), Yale University (1947–1968), and University at Buffalo (1968–1973). In 1921, he was Paul Ehrenfest's assistant in Leiden University.

== Biography ==
He was born in the city of Mykolaiv in the family of the teacher Abram Schneider. After the death of his mother in December 1911, his father left for the United States of America. Until 1915, Gregory studied at the Mykolaiv Oleksandrivska gymnasium. In 1915, he followed his father to USA. He studied at Johns Hopkins University: in 1918 he obtained a Bachelor degree, in 1920 a Master degree, and in 1921 he earned a PhD in physics. In 1921-1922, he worked as a researcher at Leiden University. In 1922-1923, he was a research fellow at Harvard University. From 1923 to 1924, he was an assistant professor at the University of Minnesota. In 1925, while at the Carnegie Institution of Washington, Breit joined with Merle Tuve in using a pulsed radio transmitter to determine the height of the ionosphere, a technique important later in radar development.

Together with Eugene Wigner, Breit gave a description of particle resonant states with the relativistic Breit–Wigner distribution in 1929, and with Edward Condon, he first described proton-proton dispersion. He is also credited with deriving the Breit equation. The Breit frame of reference is named after him. He was one of the first to notice the zitterbewegung (jittery motion) in the solutions of the Dirac equation.

In 1934, together with John A. Wheeler, Breit described the Breit–Wheeler process. In 1939 he was elected to the National Academy of Sciences. In April 1940, he proposed to the National Research Council that American scientists observe a policy of self-censorship due to the possibility of their work being used for military purposes by enemy powers in World War II.

During the early stages of the war, Breit was chosen by Arthur Compton to supervise the early design of the first atomic bomb during an early phase in what would later become the Manhattan Project. Breit resigned his position in 1942, feeling that the work was going too slowly and that there had been security breaches on the project; his job went to Robert Oppenheimer, who was later appointed to scientific director of what became Project Y, the design and testing of the weapon.

In 2014, experimentalists proposed a way to validate an idea by Breit and John A. Wheeler that matter formation could be achieved by interacting light particles ("Breit–Wheeler process").

Breit was associate editor of the Physical Review four times (1927-1929, 1939-1941, 1954-1956, and 1961-1963).

He was elected in 1923 a Fellow of the American Physical Society. He was awarded the Franklin Medal in 1964. In 1967, he was awarded the National Medal of Science.
