= Dotcom =

Dotcom may refer to:

- .com (short for "commercials"), a generic top-level Internet domain
- dot-com company, a company which does most of its business on the Internet
  - dot-com bubble (also known as the dot-com era), a financial bubble running roughly from 1995 to 2000

== Other ==
- .COM (short for "command"), a file extension associated with DOS executable file
- Kim Dotcom (born Kim Schmitz, born 1974), German-Finnish technology entrepreneur
- Walter "Dot Com" Slattery, a fictional character from 30 Rock
- Dot.Com (film), a 2008 Portuguese comedy
- Dot.Com (album), a 2000 album by The Residents
- Christopher Comstock (Marshmello), also known as "Dotcom", an American electronic dance music producer and DJ
- Rich Dotcom, a character in the NBC series Blindspot
- Cloned pig in 2000
- DOT COM, callsign used for flights registered with Fltplan.com

== See also ==
- com (disambiguation)
