= Invariant mass =

Motion-independent mass, equals total mass when at rest

The invariant mass, rest mass, intrinsic mass, proper mass, or in the case of bound systems simply mass, is the portion of the total mass of an object or system of objects that is independent of the overall motion of the system. More precisely, it is a characteristic of the system's total energy and momentum that is the same in all frames of reference related by Lorentz transformations. If a center-of-momentum frame exists for the system, then the invariant mass of a system is equal to its total mass in that "rest frame". In other reference frames, where the system's momentum is non-zero, the total mass (a.k.a. relativistic mass) of the system is greater than the invariant mass, but the invariant mass remains unchanged.

Because of mass–energy equivalence, the rest energy of the system is simply the invariant mass times the speed of light squared. Similarly, the total energy of the system is its total (relativistic) mass times the speed of light squared.

Systems whose four-momentum is a null vector, a light-like vector within the context of Minkowski space (for example, a single photon or many photons moving in exactly the same direction) have zero invariant mass and are referred to as massless. A physical object or particle moving faster than the speed of light would have space-like four-momenta (such as the hypothesized tachyon), and these do not appear to exist. Any time-like four-momentum possesses a reference frame where the momentum (3-dimensional) is zero, which is a center of momentum frame. In this case, invariant mass is positive and is referred to as the rest mass.

If objects within a system are in relative motion, then the invariant mass of the whole system will differ from the sum of the objects' rest masses. This is also equal to the total energy of the system divided by c^{2}. See mass–energy equivalence for a discussion of definitions of mass. Since the mass of systems must be measured with a weight or mass scale in a center of momentum frame in which the entire system has zero momentum, such a scale always measures the system's invariant mass. For example, a scale would measure the kinetic energy of the molecules in a bottle of gas to be part of invariant mass of the bottle, and thus also its rest mass. The same is true for massless particles in such system, which add invariant mass and also rest mass to systems, according to their energy.

For an isolated massive system, the center of mass of the system moves in a straight line with a steady subluminal velocity (with a velocity depending on the reference frame used to view it). Thus, an observer can always be placed to move along with it. In this frame, which is the center-of-momentum frame, the total momentum is zero, and the system as a whole may be thought of as being "at rest" if it is a bound system (like a bottle of gas). In this frame, which exists under these assumptions, the invariant mass of the system is equal to the total system energy (in the zero-momentum frame) divided by c^{2}. This total energy in the center of momentum frame, is the minimum energy which the system may be observed to have, when seen by various observers from various inertial frames.

Note that for reasons above, such a rest frame does not exist for single photons, or rays of light moving in one direction. When two or more photons move in different directions, however, a center of mass frame (or "rest frame" if the system is bound) exists. Thus, the mass of a system of several photons moving in different directions is positive, which means that an invariant mass exists for this system even though it does not exist for each photon.

Possible 4-momenta of particles. One has zero invariant mass, the other is massive

== Sum of rest masses ==
The invariant mass of a system includes the mass of any kinetic energy of the system constituents that remains in the center of momentum frame, so the invariant mass of a system may be greater than sum of the invariant masses (rest masses) of its separate constituents. For example, rest mass and invariant mass are zero for individual photons even though they may add mass to the invariant mass of systems. For this reason, invariant mass is in general not an additive quantity (although there are a few rare situations where it may be, as is the case when massive particles in a system without potential or kinetic energy can be added to a total mass).

Consider the simple case of two-body system, where object A is moving towards another object B which is initially at rest (in any particular frame of reference). The magnitude of invariant mass of this two-body system (see definition below) is different from the sum of rest mass (i.e. their respective mass when stationary). Even if we consider the same system from center-of-momentum frame, where net momentum is zero, the magnitude of the system's invariant mass is not equal to the sum of the rest masses of the particles within it.

The kinetic energy of such particles and the potential energy of the force fields increase the total energy above the sum of the particle rest masses, and both terms contribute to the invariant mass of the system. The sum of the particle kinetic energies as calculated by an observer is smallest in the center of momentum frame (again, called the "rest frame" if the system is bound).

They will often also interact through one or more of the fundamental forces, giving them a potential energy of interaction, possibly negative.

== As defined in particle physics ==
In particle physics, the invariant mass m_{0} is equal to the mass in the rest frame of the particle, and can be calculated by the particle's energy E and its momentum p as measured in any frame, by the energy–momentum relation:
$$m_0^2 c^2 = \left( \frac{E}{c} \right) ^2 - \left\| \mathbf{p} \right\| ^2$$
or, in natural units where c = 1,
$$m_0^2 = E^2 - \left\| \mathbf{p} \right\| ^2 .$$

Invariant mass is the same in all frames of reference (see also special relativity). The equations above imply that the invariant mass is the pseudo-Euclidean length of the four-vector (E, p), calculated using the relativistic version of the Pythagorean theorem which has a different sign for the space and time dimensions. This length is preserved under any Lorentz boost or rotation in four dimensions, just like the ordinary length of a vector is preserved under rotations. In quantum theory the invariant mass is a parameter in the relativistic Dirac equation for an elementary particle. The Dirac quantum operator corresponds to the particle four-momentum vector.

Since the invariant mass is determined from quantities which are conserved during a decay, the invariant mass calculated using the energy and momentum of the decay products of a single particle is equal to the mass of the particle that decayed. The mass of a system of particles can be calculated from the general formula:
$$\left( W c^2 \right) ^2 = \left( \sum E \right) ^2 - \left\| \sum \mathbf{p} c \right\| ^2 ,$$
where

- $W$ is the invariant mass of the system of particles, equal to the mass of the decay particle.
- $\sum E$ is the sum of the energies of the particles
- $\sum \mathbf{p}$ is the vector sum of the momentum of the particles (includes both magnitude and direction of the momenta)

The term invariant mass is also used in inelastic scattering experiments. Given an inelastic reaction with total incoming energy larger than the total detected energy (i.e. not all outgoing particles are detected in the experiment), the invariant mass (also known as the "missing mass") W of the reaction is defined as follows (in natural units):
$$W^2 = \left( \sum E_\text{in} - \sum E_\text{out} \right) ^2 - \left\| \sum \mathbf{p}_\text{in} - \sum \mathbf{p}_\text{out} \right\| ^2 .$$

If there is one dominant particle which was not detected during an experiment, a plot of the invariant mass will show a sharp peak at the mass of the missing particle.

In those cases when the momentum along one direction cannot be measured (i.e. in the case of a neutrino, whose presence is only inferred from the missing energy) the transverse mass is used.

== Example: two-particle collision ==
In a two-particle collision (or a two-particle decay) the square of the invariant mass (in natural units) is
$$\begin{align}
M^2 &= ( E_1 + E_2 ) ^2 - \left\| \mathbf{p}_1 + \mathbf{p}_2 \right\| ^2 \\
&= m_1^2 + m_2^2 + 2 \left( E_1 E_2 - \mathbf{p}_1 \cdot \mathbf{p}_2 \right) .
\end{align}$$

=== Massless particles ===
The invariant mass of a system made of two massless particles whose momenta form an angle $\theta$ has a convenient expression:
$$\begin{align}
M^2 &= (E_1 + E_2) ^2 - \left\| \textbf{p}_1 + \textbf{p}_2 \right\| ^2 \\
&= [ ( p_1 , 0 , 0 , p_1 ) + ( p_2 , 0 , p_2 \sin \theta , p_2 \cos \theta ) ] ^2 \\
&= (p_1 + p_2) ^2 - p_2 ^2 \sin^2 \theta - ( p_1 + p_2 \cos \theta ) ^2 \\
&= 2 p_1 p_2 ( 1 - \cos \theta ) .
\end{align}$$

=== Collider experiments ===
In particle collider experiments, one often defines the angular position of a particle in terms of an azimuthal angle $\phi$ and pseudorapidity $\eta$. Additionally the transverse momentum, $p_{T}$, is usually measured. In this case if the particles are massless, or highly relativistic ($E \gg m$) then the invariant mass becomes:
$$M^2 = 2 p_{T 1} p_{T 2} ( \cosh(\eta_1 - \eta_2) - \cos (\phi_1 - \phi_2) ) .$$

== Rest energy ==
Rest energy (also called rest mass energy) is the energy associated with a particle's invariant mass.

The rest energy $E_0$ of a particle is defined as:
$$E_0 = m_0 c^2,$$
where $c$ is the speed of light in vacuum. In general, only differences in energy have physical significance.

The concept of rest energy follows from the special theory of relativity that leads to Einstein's famous conclusion about equivalence of energy and mass. See Special relativity § Relativistic dynamics and invariance.

== See also ==
- Mass in special relativity
- Invariant (physics)
- Transverse mass
