= Local coordinates =

Used in a local coordinate system or a local coordinate space

Local coordinates are the ones used in a local coordinate system or a local coordinate space. Simple examples:

- Houses. In order to work in a house construction, the measurements are referred to a control arbitrary point that will allow to check it: stick/sticks on the ground, steel bar, nails...
- Addresses. Using house numbers to locate a house on a street; the street is a local coordinate system within a larger system composed of city townships, states, countries, postal codes, etc.

Local systems exist for convenience. In ancient times, every work was made on relative bases as there was no conception of global systems. Practically, it is better to use local systems for small works as houses, buildings... For most of the applications, it is desired the position of one element relative to one building or location, and in a more local way, relative to one furniture or person. In a regular way, you will not give your position by geographical coordinates rather than "I am 15 meters away of the entry to the building". So it is a pretty common way to locate things.

It is possible to bring latitude and longitude for all terrestrial locations, but unless one has a highly precise GPS device or you make astronomical observations, this is impractical. It is much simpler to use a tape, a rope, a chain... The position information (global) should be transformed into a location. Position refers to a numeric or symbolic description within a spatial reference system, whereas location refers to information about surrounding objects and their interrelationships. (Topological space)

== Use ==
In computer graphics and computer animation, local coordinate spaces are also useful for their ability to model independently transformable aspects of geometrical scene graphs. When modeling a car, for example, it is desirable to describe the center of each wheel with respect to the car's coordinate system, but then specify the shape of each wheel in separate local spaces centered about these points. This way, the information describing each wheel can be simply duplicated four times, and independent transformations (e.g., steering rotation) can be similarly effected. Bounding volumes of objects may be described more accurately using extents in the local coordinates, (i.e. an object oriented bounding box, contrasted with the simpler axis aligned bounding box). The trade-off for this flexibility is additional computational cost: the rendering system must access the higher-level coordinate system of the car and combine it with the space of each wheel in order to draw everything in its proper place.

Local coordinates also afford digital designers a means around the finite limits of numerical representation. The tread marks on a tire, for example, can be described using millimeters by allowing the whole tire to occupy the entire range of numeric precision available. The larger aspects of the car, such as its frame, might be described in centimeters, and the terrain that the car travels on could be specified in meters.

In differential topology, local coordinates on a manifold are defined by means of an atlas of charts. The basic idea behind coordinate charts is that each small patch of a manifold can be endowed with a set of local coordinates. These are collected together into an atlas, and stitched together in such a way that they are self-consistent on the manifold.

In Cartography and Maps, the traditional way of works are local datum. With a local datum the land can be mapped on relatively small areas as a country. With the need of global systems, the transformations between datum became a problem, so geodetic datum have been created. More than 150 local datum have been used in the world.

== See also ==
- Bounding volume hierarchy
- Coordinate system
- Geographic coordinate system
- House numbering
- Laboratory frame of reference
- Local reference frame
- Local tangent plane coordinates
- Skeletal animation
