= Local reference frame =

Theoretical physics term

In theoretical physics, a local reference frame (local frame) refers to a coordinate system or frame of reference that is only expected to function over a small region or a restricted region of space or spacetime.

The term is most often used in the context of the application of local inertial frames to small regions of a gravitational field. Although gravitational tidal forces will cause the background geometry to become noticeably non-Euclidean over larger regions, if we restrict ourselves to a sufficiently small region containing a cluster of objects falling together in an effectively uniform gravitational field, their physics can be described as the physics of that cluster in a space free from explicit background gravitational effects.

== Equivalence principle ==
When constructing his general theory of relativity, Einstein made the following observation: a freely falling object in a gravitational field will not be able to detect the existence of the field by making local measurements ("a falling man feels no gravity"). Einstein was then able to complete his general theory by arguing that the physics of curved spacetime must reduce over small regions to the physics of simple inertial mechanics (in this case special relativity) for small free-falling regions. Einstein referred to this as "the happiest idea of my life" (Zee (2001), p. 17.

== Laboratory frame ==
In physics, the laboratory frame of reference, or lab frame for short, is a frame of reference centered on the laboratory in which the experiment (either real or thought experiment) is done. This is the reference frame in which the laboratory is at rest. Also, this is usually the frame of reference in which measurements are made, since they are presumed (unless stated otherwise) to be made by laboratory instruments. An example of instruments in a lab frame, would be the particle detectors at the detection facility of a particle accelerator.

== See also ==
- Breit frame
- Center-of-mass frame
- Frame bundle
- Inertial frame of reference
- Local coordinates
- Local spacetime structure
- Lorentz covariance
- Minkowski space
- Normal coordinates
