= Frame of reference =

Abstract coordinate system

In physics and astronomy, a frame of reference (or reference frame) is an abstract coordinate system, whose origin, orientation, and scale have been specified in physical space. It is based on a set of reference points, defined as geometric points whose position is identified both mathematically (with numerical coordinate values) and physically (signaled by conventional markers). An important special case is that of an inertial reference frame where the laws of physics are clearer.

For n dimensions, n + 1 reference points are sufficient to fully define a reference frame. Using rectangular Cartesian coordinates, a reference frame may be defined with a reference point at the origin and a reference point at one unit distance from the origin along each of the n coordinate axes.

In Einsteinian relativity, reference frames are used to specify the relationship between a moving observer and the phenomenon under observation. In this context, the term often becomes observational frame of reference (or observational reference frame), which implies that the observer is at rest in the frame, although not necessarily located at its origin.

The postulates and results of special relativity are specified in terms of frames of reference. Postulating that the laws of physics are the same in all frames and that every frame observes the same speed of light, independent of the light's origin, leads to the understanding that time is a property associated with a frame of reference, not an absolute property throughout space.

== Definition ==
Spacetime diagram of three frames of reference in special relativity. The black frame is at rest. The primed frame moves at 40% of light speed, and the double primed frame at 80%. Note the scissors-like change as speed increases.

A frame of reference is an imaginary coordinate system associated with the motion of an object or an observer.

In special relativity, a spacetime frame is a coordinate lattice constructed to be an orthonormal, right-handed set of spacelike vectors perpendicular to a timelike vector.

There are two types of reference frames: inertial and non-inertial. An inertial frame of reference is defined as one in which Newton's first law is observed to be correct. Any object stationary in an inertial frame remains stationary in that frame unless a force acts to accelerate the object. Any object moving at a constant velocity relative to the frame continues at that velocity unless forced to accelerate. Inertial frames are used in the two postulates of special relativity: that the laws of physics are the same and that the speed of light has the same value in all inertial frames.

In contrast to the inertial frame, a non-inertial frame of reference is one in which fictitious forces must be invoked to explain observations. An example is an observational frame of reference centered at a point on the Earth's surface. This frame of reference orbits around the center of the Earth, which introduces the fictitious forces known as the Coriolis force, centrifugal force, and gravitational force. (All of these forces including gravity disappear in a truly inertial reference frame, which is one of free-fall.)

== Time ==
A frame of reference can be associated with time by imagining a series of clocks spread throughout space. Each clock can be synchronized (reset to zero) to a reference clock at the origin of the frame by sending a flash of light from the reference clock to the remote clock. Events occurring at distance locations are recorded using the local clock, then the record is sent back to the origin. This conceptual sequence ensures that the record of the remote event has the correct time and is how observation is defined for reference frames.

== Coordinate systems ==
An observer O, situated at the origin of a local set of coordinates – a frame of reference F. The observer in this frame uses the coordinates (x, y, z, t) to describe a spacetime event, shown as a star.

A coordinate system in mathematics is a facet of geometry or of algebra, in particular, a property of manifolds (for example, in physics, configuration spaces or phase spaces). The coordinates of a point r in an n-dimensional space are simply an ordered set of n numbers:

$$\mathbf{r} = [x^1,\ x^2,\ \dots,\ x^n].$$

In a general Banach space, these numbers could be (for example) coefficients in a functional expansion like a Fourier series. In a physical problem, they could be spacetime coordinates or normal mode amplitudes. In a robot design, they could be angles of relative rotations, linear displacements, or deformations of joints. Here we will suppose these coordinates can be related to a Cartesian coordinate system by a set of functions:

$$x^j = x^j (x,\ y,\ z,\ \dots),\quad j = 1,\ \dots,\ n,$$

where x, y, z, etc. are the n Cartesian coordinates of the point. Given these functions, coordinate surfaces are defined by the relations:

$$x^j (x, y, z, \dots) = \mathrm{constant},\quad j = 1,\ \dots,\ n.$$

The intersection of these surfaces define coordinate lines. At any selected point, tangents to the intersecting coordinate lines at that point define a set of basis vectors {e_{1}, e_{2}, ..., e_{n}} at that point. That is:

$$\mathbf{e}_i(\mathbf{r}) = \lim_{\epsilon \rightarrow 0} \frac{\mathbf{r}\left(x^1,\ \dots,\ x^i + \epsilon,\ \dots,\ x^n\right) - \mathbf{r}\left(x^1,\ \dots,\ x^i,\ \dots ,\ x^n\right)}{\epsilon},\quad i = 1,\ \dots,\ n,$$

which can be normalized to be of unit length. For more detail see curvilinear coordinates.

Coordinate surfaces, coordinate lines, and basis vectors are components of a coordinate system. If the basis vectors are orthogonal at every point, the coordinate system is an orthogonal coordinate system.

An important aspect of a coordinate system is its metric tensor g_{ik}, which determines the arc length ds in the coordinate system in terms of its coordinates:

$$(ds)^2 = g_{ik}\ dx^i\ dx^k,$$

where repeated indices are summed over.

As is apparent from these remarks, a coordinate system is a mathematical construct, part of an axiomatic system. There is no necessary connection between coordinate systems and physical motion (or any other aspect of reality). However, coordinate systems can include time as a coordinate, and can be used to describe motion. Thus, Lorentz transformations and Galilean transformations may be viewed as coordinate transformations.

== Mathematical issues ==
A coordinate system is a mathematical concept, amounting to a choice of language used to describe observations. Consequently, an observer in an observational frame of reference can choose to employ any coordinate system (Cartesian, polar, curvilinear, generalized, ...) to describe observations made from that frame of reference. A change in the choice of this coordinate system does not change an observer's state of motion, and so does not entail a change in the observer's observational frame of reference. This viewpoint can be found elsewhere as well. Which is not to dispute that some coordinate systems may be a better choice for some observations than are others.

Choice of what to measure and with what observational apparatus is a matter separate from the observer's state of motion and choice of coordinate system. Here is a quotation applicable to moving observational frames $\mathfrak{R}$ and various associated Euclidean three-space coordinate systems [R, R′, etc.]:

We first introduce the notion of reference frame, itself related to the idea of observer: the reference frame is, in some sense, the "Euclidean space carried by the observer". Let us give a more mathematical definition:… the reference frame is... the set of all points in the Euclidean space with the rigid body motion of the observer. The frame, denoted $\mathfrak{R}$, is said to move with the observer.… The spatial positions of particles are labelled relative to a frame $\mathfrak{R}$ by establishing a coordinate system R with origin O. The corresponding set of axes, sharing the rigid body motion of the frame $\mathfrak{R}$, can be considered to give a physical realization of $\mathfrak{R}$. In a frame $\mathfrak{R}$, coordinates are changed from R to R′ by carrying out, at each instant of time, the same coordinate transformation on the components of intrinsic objects (vectors and tensors) introduced to represent physical quantities in this frame.

and this on the utility of separating the notions of $\mathfrak{R}$ and [R, R′, etc.]:

As noted by Brillouin, a distinction between mathematical sets of coordinates and physical frames of reference must be made. The ignorance of such distinction is the source of much confusion… the dependent functions such as velocity for example, are measured with respect to a physical reference frame, but one is free to choose any mathematical coordinate system in which the equations are specified.

and this, also on the distinction between $\mathfrak{R}$ and [R, R′, etc.]:

The idea of a reference frame is really quite different from that of a coordinate system. Frames differ just when they define different spaces (sets of rest points) or times (sets of simultaneous events). So the ideas of a space, a time, of rest and simultaneity, go inextricably together with that of frame. However, a mere shift of origin, or a purely spatial rotation of space coordinates results in a new coordinate system. So frames correspond at best to classes of coordinate systems.

and from J. D. Norton:

In traditional developments of special and general relativity it has been customary not to distinguish between two quite distinct ideas. The first is the notion of a coordinate system, understood simply as the smooth, invertible assignment of four numbers to events in spacetime neighborhoods. The second, the frame of reference, refers to an idealized system used to assign such numbers […] To avoid unnecessary restrictions, we can divorce this arrangement from metrical notions. […] Of special importance for our purposes is that each frame of reference has a definite state of motion at each event of spacetime. […] Within the context of special relativity and as long as we restrict ourselves to frames of reference in inertial motion, then little of importance depends on the difference between an inertial frame of reference and the inertial coordinate system it induces. This comfortable circumstance ceases immediately once we begin to consider frames of reference in nonuniform motion even within special relativity.…More recently, to negotiate the obvious ambiguities of Einstein’s treatment, the notion of frame of reference has reappeared as a structure distinct from a coordinate system.

== Measurement apparatus ==
A further aspect of a frame of reference is the role of the measurement apparatus (for example, clocks and rods) attached to the frame (see Norton quote above). This question is not addressed in this article, and is of particular interest in quantum mechanics, where the relation between observer and measurement is still under discussion (see measurement problem).

In physics experiments, the frame of reference in which the laboratory measurement devices are at rest is usually referred to as the laboratory frame or simply "lab frame." An example would be the frame in which the detectors for a particle accelerator are at rest. The lab frame in some experiments is an inertial frame, but it is not required to be (for example the laboratory on the surface of the Earth in many physics experiments is not inertial). In particle physics experiments, it is often useful to transform energies and momenta of particles from the lab frame where they are measured, to the center of momentum frame "COM frame" in which calculations are sometimes simplified, since potentially all kinetic energy still present in the COM frame may be used for making new particles.

In this connection it may be noted that the clocks and rods often used to describe observers' measurement equipment in thought, in practice are replaced by a much more complicated and indirect metrology that is connected to the nature of the vacuum, and uses atomic clocks that operate according to the Standard Model and that must be corrected for gravitational time dilation. (See second, meter and kilogram).

In fact, Einstein felt that clocks and rods were merely expedient measuring devices and they should be replaced by more fundamental entities based upon, for example, atoms and molecules.

== Generalization ==
Brading and Castellani view changes of representation in quantum mechanics or changes of gauge in quantum field theory as generalizations of transformations between frames of reference. Such changes leave certain properties invariant analogous to how Lorentz transformations leave the law of physics invariant. Extension to coordinate systems using generalized coordinates underlies the Hamiltonian and Lagrangian formulations of quantum field theory, classical relativistic mechanics, and quantum gravity.

== Instances ==
- International Terrestrial Reference Frame
- International Celestial Reference Frame
- In fluid mechanics, Lagrangian and Eulerian specification of the flow field

Other frames

- Frame fields in general relativity
- Moving frame in mathematics

== See also ==
- Analytical mechanics
- Applied mechanics
- Cartesian coordinate system
- Center-of-momentum frame
- Centrifugal force
- Centripetal force
- Classical mechanics
- Coriolis force
- Curvilinear coordinates
- Datum reference
- Dynamics (physics)
- Frenet–Serret formulas
- Galilean invariance
- General relativity
- Generalized coordinates
- Generalized forces
- Geodetic reference frame
- Inertial frame of reference
- Local coordinates
- Material frame-indifference
- Rod and frame test
- Kinematics
- Laboratory frame of reference
- Lorentz transformation
- Mach's principle
- Orthogonal coordinates
- Principle of relativity
- Quantum reference frame
