= Center-of-momentum frame =

Unique inertial frame in which the total momentum of a physical system vanishes

In physics, the center-of-momentum frame (COM frame) of a system, also known as zero-momentum frame, is the inertial frame in which the total momentum of the system vanishes. It is unique up to velocity, but not origin. The center of momentum of a system is not a location, but a collection of relative momenta/velocities: a reference frame. Thus "center of momentum" is short for "center-of-momentum frame".

A special case of the center-of-momentum frame is the center-of-mass frame: an inertial frame in which the center of mass (which is a single point) remains at the origin. In all center-of-momentum frames, the center of mass is at rest, but it is not necessarily at the origin of the coordinate system. In special relativity, only when the system is isolated is the COM frame necessarily unique.

== Properties ==
=== General ===
The center of momentum frame is defined as the inertial frame in which the sum of the linear momenta of all particles is equal to 0. Let S denote the laboratory reference system and S′ denote the center-of-momentum reference frame. Using a Galilean transformation, the particle velocity in S′ is

$$v' = v - V_\text{c} ,$$

where

$$V_\text{c} = \frac{\sum_i m_i v_i}{\sum_i m_i}$$

is the velocity of the mass center. The total momentum in the center-of-momentum system then vanishes:

$$\sum_{i} p'_i = \sum_{i} m_i v'_i
= \sum_{i} m_i (v_i - V_\text{c})
= \sum_{i} m_i v_i - \sum_i m_i \frac{\sum_j m_j v_j}{\sum_j m_j}
= \sum_i m_i v_i - \sum_j m_j v_j
= 0.$$

Also, the total energy of the system is the minimal energy as seen from all inertial reference frames.

=== Special relativity ===
In relativity, the COM frame exists for an isolated massive system. This is a consequence of Noether's theorem. In the COM frame the total energy of the system is the rest energy, and this quantity (when divided by the factor c^{2}, where c is the speed of light) gives the invariant mass (rest mass) of the system:

$$m_0 = \frac{E_0}{c^2}.$$

The invariant mass of the system is given in any inertial frame by the relativistic invariant relation

$$m_0{}^2 =\left(\frac{E}{c^2}\right)^2-\left(\frac{p}{c}\right)^2 ,$$

but for zero momentum the momentum term (p/c)^{2} vanishes and thus the total energy coincides with the rest energy.

Systems that have nonzero energy but zero rest mass (such as photons moving in a single direction, or, equivalently, plane electromagnetic waves) do not have COM frames, because there is no frame in which they have zero net momentum. Due to the invariance of the speed of light, a massless system must travel at the speed of light in any frame, and always possesses a net momentum. Its energy is – for each reference frame – equal to the magnitude of momentum multiplied by the speed of light:

$$E = p c .$$

== Two-body problem ==
An example of the usage of this frame is given below – in a two-body collision, not necessarily elastic (where kinetic energy is conserved). The COM frame can be used to find the momentum of the particles much easier than in a lab frame: the frame where the measurement or calculation is done. The situation is analyzed using Galilean transformations and conservation of momentum (for generality, rather than kinetic energies alone), for two particles of mass m_{1} and m_{2}, moving at initial velocities (before collision) u_{1} and u_{2} respectively. The transformations are applied to take the velocity of the frame from the velocity of each particle from the lab frame (unprimed quantities) to the COM frame (primed quantities):

$$\mathbf{u}_1^\prime = \mathbf{u}_1 - \mathbf{V} , \quad \mathbf{u}_2^\prime = \mathbf{u}_2 - \mathbf{V} ,$$

where V is the velocity of the COM frame. Since V is the velocity of the COM, i.e. the time derivative of the COM location R (position of the center of mass of the system):

$$\begin{align}
\frac{{\rm d}\mathbf{R}}{{\rm d}t} & = \frac{{\rm d}}{{\rm d}t}\left(\frac{m_1\mathbf{r}_1+m_2\mathbf{r}_2}{m_1+m_2} \right) \\
& = \frac{m_1\mathbf{u}_1 + m_2\mathbf{u}_2 }{m_1+m_2} \\
& = \mathbf{V} \\
\end{align}$$

so at the origin of the COM frame, R' = 0, this implies

$$m_1\mathbf{u}_1^\prime + m_2\mathbf{u}_2^\prime = \boldsymbol{0}$$

The same results can be obtained by applying momentum conservation in the lab frame, where the momenta are p_{1} and p_{2}:

$$\mathbf{V} = \frac{\mathbf{p}_1 + \mathbf{p}_2}{m_1+m_2} = \frac{m_1\mathbf{u}_1 + m_2\mathbf{u}_2}{m_1+m_2}$$

and in the COM frame, where it is asserted definitively that the total momenta of the particles, p_{1}′ and p_{2}′, vanishes:

$$\mathbf{p}_1^\prime + \mathbf{p}_2^\prime = m_1\mathbf{u}_1^\prime + m_2\mathbf{u}_2^\prime = \boldsymbol{0} .$$

Using the COM frame equation to solve for V returns the lab frame equation above, demonstrating any frame (including the COM frame) may be used to calculate the momenta of the particles. It has been established that the velocity of the COM frame can be removed from the calculation using the above frame, so the momenta of the particles in the COM frame can be expressed in terms of the quantities in the lab frame (i.e. the given initial values):

$$\begin{align}
\mathbf{p}_1^\prime & = m_1\mathbf{u}_1^\prime \\
& = m_1 \left( \mathbf{u}_1 - \mathbf{V} \right) = \frac{m_1m_2}{m_1+m_2} \left( \mathbf{u}_1 - \mathbf{u}_2 \right) \\
& = -m_2\mathbf{u}_2^\prime = -\mathbf{p}_2^\prime \\
\end{align} .$$

Notice that the relative velocity in the lab frame of particle 1 to 2 is

$$\Delta\mathbf{u} = \mathbf{u}_1 - \mathbf{u}_2$$

and the 2-body reduced mass is

$$\mu = \frac{m_1m_2}{m_1+m_2}$$

so the momenta of the particles compactly reduce to

$$\mathbf{p}_1^\prime = -\mathbf{p}_2^\prime = \mu \Delta\mathbf{u} .$$

This is a substantially simpler calculation of the momenta of both particles; the reduced mass and relative velocity can be calculated from the initial velocities in the lab frame and the masses, and the momentum of one particle is simply the negative of the other. The calculation can be repeated for final velocities v_{1} and v_{2} in place of the initial velocities u_{1} and u_{2}, since after the collision the velocities still satisfy the above equations:

$$\begin{align}
\frac{{\rm d}\mathbf{R}}{{\rm d}t} & = \frac{{\rm d}}{{\rm d}t}\left(\frac{m_1\mathbf{r}_1+m_2\mathbf{r}_2}{m_1+m_2} \right) \\
& = \frac{m_1\mathbf{v}_1 + m_2\mathbf{v}_2 }{m_1+m_2} \\
& = \mathbf{V} \\
\end{align}$$

so at the origin of the COM frame, R = 0, this implies after the collision

$$m_1\mathbf{v}_1^\prime + m_2\mathbf{v}_2^\prime = \boldsymbol{0}$$

In the lab frame, the conservation of momentum fully reads:

$$m_1\mathbf{u}_1 + m_2\mathbf{u}_2 = m_1\mathbf{v}_1 + m_2\mathbf{v}_2 = (m_1+m_2)\mathbf{V}$$

This equation does not imply that

$$m_1\mathbf{u}_1 = m_1\mathbf{v}_1 = m_1\mathbf{V}, \quad m_2\mathbf{u}_2 = m_2\mathbf{v}_2 = m_2\mathbf{V}$$

instead, it simply indicates the total mass M multiplied by the velocity of the centre of mass V is the total momentum P of the system:

$$\begin{align} \mathbf{P} & = \mathbf{p}_1 + \mathbf{p}_2 \\
& = (m_1 + m_2)\mathbf{V} \\
& = M\mathbf{V}
\end{align}$$

Similar analysis to the above obtains

$$\mathbf{p}_1^\prime = -\mathbf{p}_2^\prime = \mu \Delta\mathbf{v} = \mu \Delta\mathbf{u} ,$$

where the final relative velocity in the lab frame of particle 1 to 2 is

$$\Delta\mathbf{v} = \mathbf{v}_1 - \mathbf{v}_2 = \Delta\mathbf{u}.$$

== See also ==
- Laboratory frame of reference
- Breit frame
