= Buffer-gas trap =

Device used to accumulate positrons

The buffer-gas trap (BGT) is a device used to accumulate positrons (the antiparticles of electrons) efficiently while minimizing positron loss due to annihilation, which occurs when an electron and positron collide and the energy is converted to gamma rays. The BGT is used for a variety of research applications, particularly those that benefit from specially tailored positron gases, plasmas and/or pulsed beams. Examples include use of the BGT to create antihydrogen and the positronium molecule.

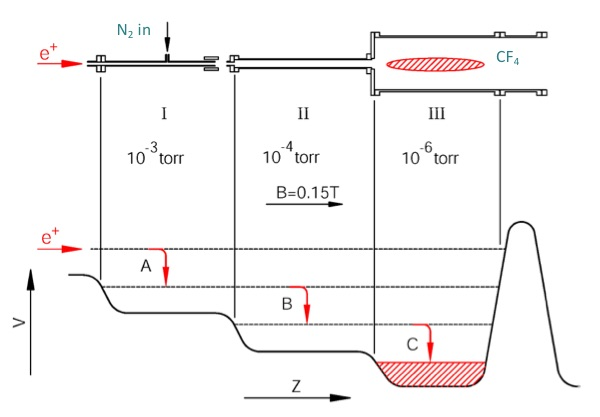
Fig. 1. Three-stage BGT to accumulate positrons: (above) electrode structure, and (below) electrical potential along the direction of the 0.15 T magnetic field. Positrons incident from the left are trapped and cooled, first by electronic excitation of N_{2} molecules (A, B, C), and then by inelastic vibrational (rotational) collisions with CF_{4} (N_{2}).

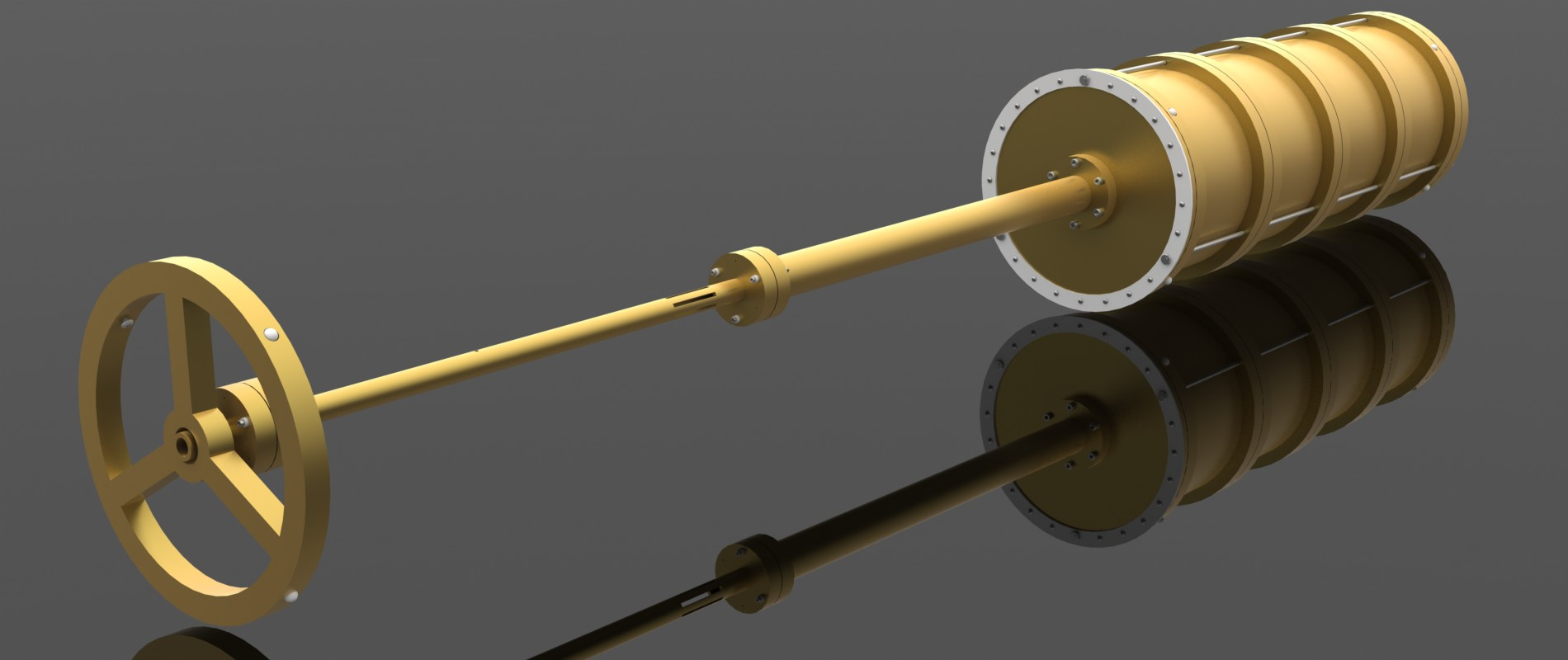
Fig. 2. Electrode structure (gold plated, 1.7 m in length) for a three-stage BGT circa 1996.

== Design and operation ==
The schematic design of a BGT is illustrated in Fig. 1. It consists of a specially designed (Penning or Penning–Malmberg) type electromagnetic trap. Positrons are confined in a vacuum inside an electrode structure consisting of a stack of hollow, cylindrical metal electrodes such as that shown in Fig. 2. A uniform axial magnetic field inhibits positron motion radially, and voltages imposed on end electrodes prevent axial loss. Such traps are renowned for their good confinement properties for particles (such as positrons) of a single sign of charge.

Given a trap designed for good confinement, a remaining challenge is to efficiently fill the device. In the BGT, this is accomplished using a series of inelastic collisions with a molecular gas. In a positron-molecule collision, annihilation is much less probable than energy loss due to electronic or vibrational excitation. The BGT has a stepped potential well (Fig. 1) with regions at successively lower gas pressure. Electronic excitation of molecular nitrogen (N_{2}) in the highest-pressure region is used to trap the positrons. This process is repeated until the particles are in a sufficiently low-pressure environment and the annihilation time is acceptably long. The particles cool to the ambient gas temperature due to inelastic vibrational and rotational collisions.

Trap efficiency is typically 5% to 30%, but can be as much as 40%. Positronium (Ps) formation via charge-exchange (e.g., e^{+} + N_{2} → N_{2}^{+} + Ps) is a major loss process. Molecular nitrogen is used because it is unique in having an electronic energy level below the threshold for Ps formation; hence it is the trapping gas of choice. Similarly, carbon tetrafluoride (CF_{4}) and sulfur hexafluoride (SF_{6}) have very large vibrational excitation cross sections, and so these gases are used for cooling to the ambient temperature (typically ~ 300 K).

While most positron sources produce positrons with energies ranging from a few kiloelectronvolts (keV) to more than 500 keV, the BGT is only useful for much lower energy particles (i.e. less than or equal to tens of electronvolts). Thus, high-energy positrons from such sources are injected into the surfaces of materials (so-called positron moderators) in which they lose energy, diffuse to the surface, and are re-emitted with electronvolt energies. The moderator of choice for the BGT is solid neon (~ 1% conversion efficiency), frozen on a cold metal surface.

The lifetime in the final trapping stage is limited by annihilation and is typically less than or equal to 100 seconds, which limits the total number of trapped positrons. If larger particle numbers are desired, the positrons are transferred to an ultra-high vacuum (UHV) Penning–Malmberg trap in a several tesla magnetic field. Annihilation is negligible in UHV. Positron cooling (necessary to combat heating due to extrinsic effects) is now due to the emission of cyclotron radiation in the large magnetic field. This accumulation and transfer process can then be repeated to build up larger collections of antimatter.

== History and uses ==
The BGT was invented in the 1980s, originally intended to study positron transport in tokamak (fusion) plasmas. Subsequently, the technique was refined and is now used in laboratories worldwide for a variety of applications. They include study of positron interactions with atoms and molecules, materials, and material surfaces; the creation of antihydrogen, the positronium molecule (i.e., Ps_{2}, e^{+}e^{−}e^{+}e^{−}), and novel positron and positronium beams. BGTs are also expected to play similarly important roles in efforts to create and study positronium atom Bose–Einstein condensates (BEC) and a classical electron–positron "pair" plasmas.

== See also ==
- Penning trap
- Non-neutral plasmas
- Positron annihilation
