= John H. Malmberg =

American physicist

John Holmes Malmberg
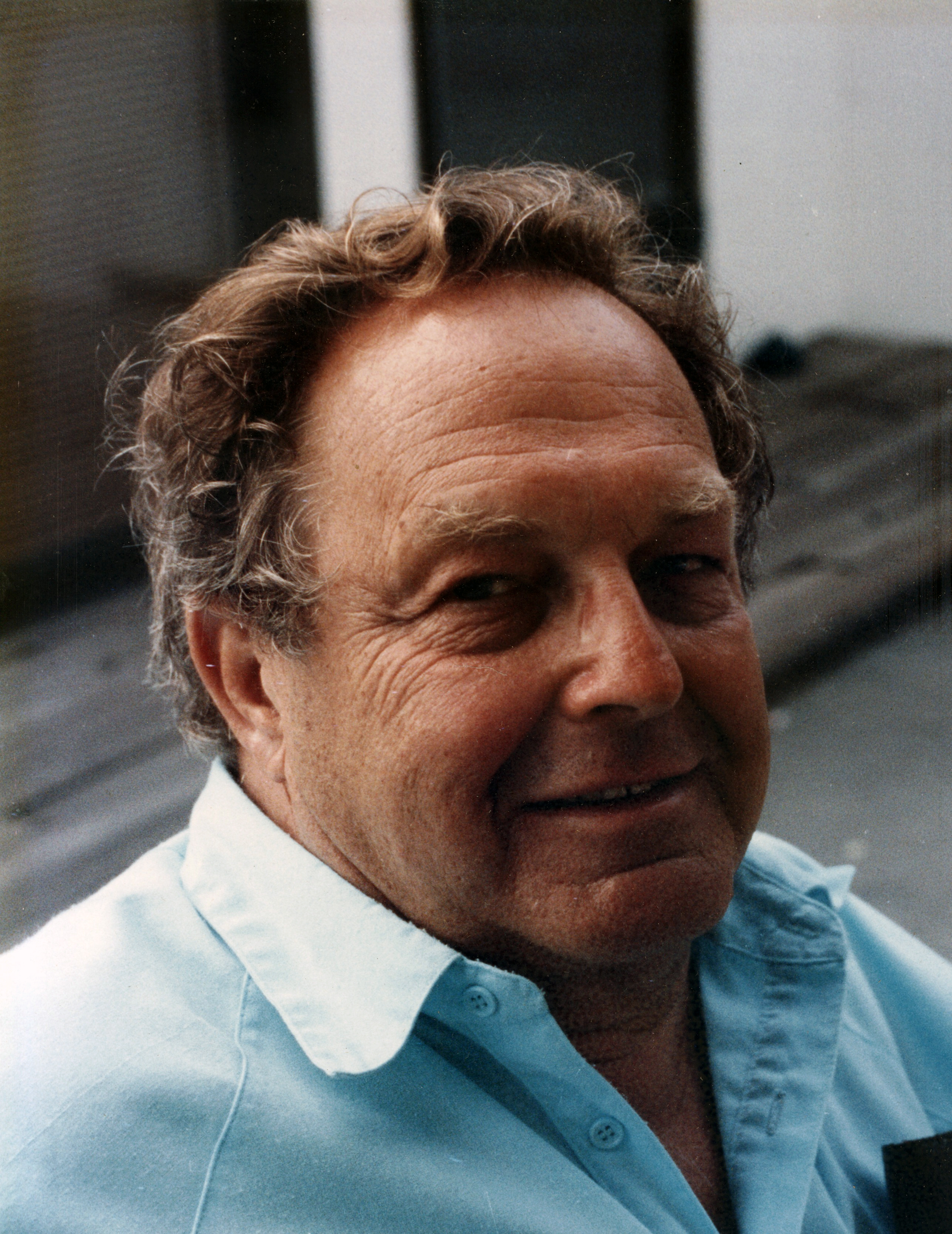
- Born: July 5, 1927; Gettysburg, Pennsylvania
- Died: November 17, 1992 (aged 65); Del Mar, California
- Education: Illinois State University (B.S.); University of Illinois at Urbana–Champaign (M.S., Ph.D.)
- Known for: Single-component and non-neutral plasma research, Penning–Malmberg trap, collisionless damping of plasma waves, plasma wave echo
- Awards: James Clerk Maxwell Prize for Plasma Physics (1985); John Dawson Award (1991)
- Scientific career
- Fields: Plasma physics
- Workplaces: General Atomics, University of California, San Diego

John Holmes Malmberg (July 5, 1927 – November 17, 1992) was an American plasma physicist and a professor at the University of California, San Diego. He was known for making the first experimental measurements of Landau damping of plasma waves in 1964, as well as for his research on non-neutral plasmas and the development of the Penning–Malmberg trap.

In 1985, Malmberg won the James Clerk Maxwell Prize for Plasma Physics for his experimental work on wave-particle interactions in neutral plasmas and his studies on pure electron plasmas. He was later co-awarded the John Dawson Award for Excellence in Plasma Physics Research in 1991 for his contribution to research on non-neutral plasmas.

== Early life and career ==
Malmberg studied at Illinois State University (bachelor 1949) and the University of Illinois at Urbana–Champaign (master 1951), where he received his doctorate in 1957. From 1957 to 1969, he was a staff scientist working in the area of plasma physics at General Atomics in San Diego, California. From 1967 until his death, he was a professor of physics at the University of California, San Diego (UCSD) in La Jolla, California.

In 1980, Malmberg was appointed to the first Plasma Sciences Committee of the National Research Council. In that capacity, he was a strong voice for the importance of basic plasma experiments in maintaining the health of plasma science. In an era when small-scale and basic plasma physics research was nearing an ebb, Malmberg emphasized the importance of being able to follow the internal logic of the science, which he believed to be of paramount importance in doing basic research.

== Scientific contributions ==
=== Landau damping of plasma waves ===
Malmberg and Charles Wharton made the first experimental measurements of Landau damping of plasma waves in 1964, two decades after its prediction by Lev Landau. Since this damping is collisionless, the free energy and phase-space memory associated with the damped wave are not lost, but are subtly stored in the plasma. Malmberg and collaborators demonstrated explicitly the reversible nature of this process by observation of the plasma wave echo in which a wave "spontaneously" appears in the plasma as an 'echo' of two previously launched waves that had been Landau damped.

=== Penning–Malmberg traps and non-neutral plasmas ===
Neutral plasmas are notoriously difficult to confine. In contrast, Malmberg and collaborators predicted and demonstrated experimentally that plasmas with a single sign of charge, such as pure electron or pure ion plasmas, can be confined for long periods (e.g., hours). This was accomplished using an arrangement of electric and magnetic fields similar to that of a Penning trap, but optimized to confine single-component plasmas. In recognition of Malmberg's contributions to the development of these devices, they are now referred to as Penning–Malmberg traps.

Malmberg and collaborators, realized that non-neutral plasmas offer research opportunities not available with neutral plasmas. In contrast to neutral plasmas, plasmas with a single sign of charge can reach states of global thermal equilibria. The possibility of using thermal equilibrium statistical mechanics to describe the plasma provides a large advantage to theory. Furthermore, states near such thermal equilibria can be more easily controlled experimentally and departures from equilibrium studied with precision.

When a neutral plasma is cooled, it simply recombines; but a plasma with a single sign of charge can be cooled without recombination. Malmberg constructed a trap for a pure electron plasma with walls at 4.2 K. Cyclotron radiation from the electrons then cooled the plasma to a few Kelvin. Theory argued that electron-electron collisions in such a strongly magnetized and low temperature plasma would be qualitatively different than those in warmer plasmas. Malmberg measured the equipartition rate between electron velocity components parallel to and perpendicular to the magnetic field and confirmed the striking prediction that it decreases exponentially with decreasing temperature.

Malmberg and Thomas M. O'Neil predicted that a very cold, single-species plasma would undergo a phase transition to a body-centered cubic crystalline state. Later, John Bollinger and collaborators created such a state by laser cooling a plasma of singly ionized beryllium ions to temperatures of a few millikelvin. In other experiments, trapped pure electron plasmas are used to model the two-dimensional (2D) vortex dynamics expected for an ideal fluid.

In the late 1980s, pure positron (i.e., antielectron) plasmas were created using the Penning–Malmberg trap technology. This, and advances in confining low-energy antiprotons, led to the creation of low-energy antihydrogen a decade later. These and subsequent developments have spawned a wealth of research with low-energy antimatter. This includes ever more precise studies of antihydrogen and comparison with the properties of hydrogen and formation of the di-positronium molecule (Ps$_2$, $e^+e^-e^+e^-$) predicted by J. A. Wheeler in 1946. The Penning–Malmberg trap technology is now being used to create a new generation of high-quality positroniumatom ($e^+e^-$) beams for atomic physics studies.

Malmberg's studies with trapped single-component and non-neutral plasmas were important in shaping the development of subsequent sub-fields of plasma physics with broad impacts in the wider world of physics.

== Honors and awards ==
In 1985, Malmberg received the James Clerk Maxwell Prize for Plasma Physics from the American Physical Society for "his outstanding experimental studies which expanded our understanding of wave-particle interactions in neutral plasmas and increased our confidence in plasma theory; and for his pioneering studies of the confinement and transport of pure electron plasmas".

And in 1991, he was co-awarded the John Dawson Award for Excellence in Plasma Physics Research with Charles F. Driscoll and Thomas M. O'Neil, for their studies of single-component electron plasmas. There is a video, filmed in 1987, where Malmberg and Tom O'Neil describe their research.

== Legacy ==
In 1993, the UCSD physics department established the John Holmes Malmberg Prize in his honor. It is awarded annually to an outstanding undergraduate physics major with interests in experimental physics.
