= Penning–Malmberg trap =

Electromagnetic device used to confine particles of a single sign of charge

The Penning–Malmberg trap (PM trap), named after Frans Penning and John Malmberg, is an electromagnetic device used to confine large numbers of charged particles of a single sign of charge. Much interest in Penning–Malmberg (PM) traps arises from the fact that if the density of particles is large and the temperature is low, the gas will become a single-component plasma. While confinement of electrically neutral plasmas is generally difficult, single-species plasmas (an example of a non-neutral plasma) can be confined for long times in PM traps. They are the method of choice to study a variety of plasma phenomena. They are also widely used to confine antiparticles such as positrons (i.e., anti-electrons) and antiprotons for use in studies of the properties of antimatter and interactions of antiparticles with matter.

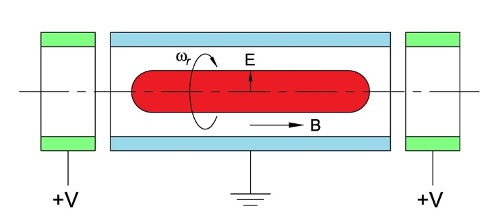
Fig. 1. Schematic diagram of a Penning–Malmberg trap biased to confine positively charged particles in a set of three cylindrical metal electrodes (green and blue). Due to the particles' charge, there is a radial electric field which causes the plasma to rotate about the magnetic field direction with angular velocity ω_{r}. See Ref. and for details.

== Design and operation ==
A schematic design of a PM trap is shown in Fig. 1. Charged particles of a single sign of charge are confined in a vacuum inside an electrode structure consisting of a stack of hollow, metal cylinders. A uniform axial magnetic field $B$ is applied to inhibit positron motion radially, and voltages are imposed on the end electrodes to prevent particle loss in the magnetic field direction. This is similar to the arrangement in a Penning trap, but with an extended confinement electrode to trap large numbers of particles (e.g., $N\geq10^{10}$).

Such traps are renowned for their good confinement properties. This is due to the fact that, for a sufficiently strong magnetic field, the canonical angular momentum $L_z$ of the charge cloud (i.e., including angular momentum due to the magnetic field B) in the direction $z$ of the field is approximately

$\quad L_z \approx-(\frac{m\omega_c}{2}){\sum}_{j=1}^N r_j^2,\qquad$	1

where $r_j$ is the radial position of the $j$th particle, $N$ is the total number of particles, and ${\omega_c}=eB/m$ is the cyclotron frequency, with particle mass m and charge e. If the system has no magnetic or electrostatic asymmetries in the plane perpendicular to $B$, there are no torques on the plasma; thus $L_z$ is constant, and the plasma cannot expand. As discussed below, these plasmas do expand due to magnetic and/or electrostatic asymmetries thought to be due to imperfections in trap construction.

The PM traps are typically filled using sources of low energy charged particles. In the case of electrons, this can be done using a hot filament or electron gun. For positrons, a sealed radioisotope source and "moderator" (the latter used to slow the positrons to electron-volt energies) can be used. Techniques have been developed to measure the plasma length, radius, temperature, and density in the trap, and to excite plasma waves and oscillations. It is frequently useful to compress plasmas radially to increase the plasma density and/or to combat asymmetry-induced transport. This can be accomplished by applying a torque on the plasma using rotating electric fields [the so-called "rotating wall" (RW) technique], or in the case of ion plasmas, using laser light. Very long confinement times (hours or days) can be achieved using these techniques.

Particle cooling is frequently necessary to maintain good confinement (e.g., to mitigate the heating from RW torques). This can be accomplished in a number of ways, such as using inelastic collisions with molecular gases, or in the case of ions, using lasers. In the case of electrons or positrons, if the magnetic field is sufficiently strong, the particles will cool by cyclotron radiation.

== History and uses ==
The confinement and properties of single species plasmas in (what are now known as) PM traps was first studied by John Malmberg and John DeGrassie. Confinement was shown to be excellent as compared to that for neutral plasmas. It was also shown that, while good, confinement is not perfect and there are particle losses.

Penning–Malmberg traps have been used to study a variety of transport mechanisms. Figure 2 shows an early study of confinement in a PM trap as a function of a background pressure of helium gas. At higher pressures, transport is due to electron-atom collisions, while at lower pressures, there is a pressure-independent particle loss mechanism. The latter ("anomalous transport") mechanism has been shown to be due to inadvertent magnetic and electrostatic asymmetries and the effects of trapped particles. There is evidence that confinement in PM traps is improved if the main confinement electrode (blue in Fig. 1) is replaced by a series of coaxial cylinders biased to create a smoothly varying potential well (a "multi-ring PM trap").

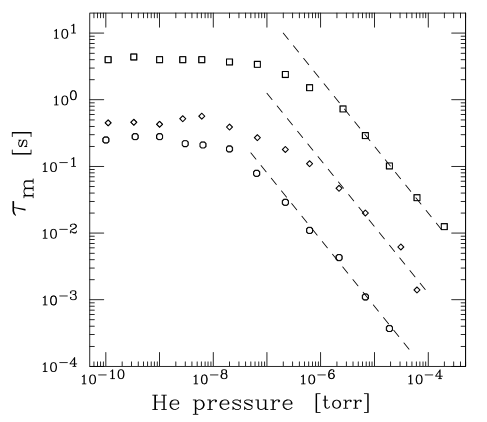
Fig. 2. Decay time $\tau_m$ of the central density of a pure electron plasma as a function of helium gas pressure at magnetic fields of (□) 0.07, (⋄) 0.02, and (○) 0.004 tesla. Adapted from Ref.

One fruitful area of research arises from the fact that plasmas in PM traps can be used to model the dynamics of inviscid two-dimensional fluid flows. PM traps are also the device of choice to accumulate and store anti-particles such as positrons and antiprotons. One has been able to create positron and antiproton plasmas and to study electron-beam positron plasma dynamics.

Pure ion plasmas can be laser-cooled into crystalline states. Cryogenic pure-ion plasmas are used to study quantum entanglement. The PM traps also provide an excellent source for cold positron beams. They have been used to study with precision positronium (Ps) atoms (the bound state of a positron and an electron, lifetime ≤ 0.1 μs) and to create and study the positronium molecule (Ps$_2$, $e^+e^-e^+e^-$). Recently PM-trap-based positron beams have been used to produce practical Ps-atom beams.

Antihydrogen is the bound state of an antiproton and a positron and the simplest antiatom. Nested PM traps (one for antiprotons and another for positrons) have been central to the successful efforts to create, trap and to compare the properties of antihydrogen with those of hydrogen. The antiparticle plasmas (and electron plasmas used to cool the antiprotons) are carefully tuned with an array of recently developed techniques to optimize the production antihydrogen atoms. These neutral antiatoms are then confined in a minimum-magnetic-field trap.

== See also ==
- Penning trap
