= Radial drift =

Radial drifting in protoplanetary disks

Radial drift is a process by which dust particles migrates in Protoplanetary disks during the formation of planetesimals. It involves the motion of solid particles within the gas-dominated environment surrounding a young star and is crucial to understanding the formation of planets from protoplanetary disks. The orbital radius of larger bodies decreases about the central star due to pressure drag reducing its orbital velocity, and consequently, angular momentum.

Protoplanetary disks are primarily composed of a mix of gas and solids. In the early stages, following a protoplanetary disk's formation, the core inhabitants are mainly dust and gas particles, making up the majority of its composition. Gas particles are significantly smaller than their solid counterparts, dust particles. Due to the differences in size of these particles, dust particles experience a greater gas pressure which alters the motion of these particles to orbit at slower velocities relative to the surrounding gas. Radial drifting refers to the particular scenario of inward drifting occurring to larger objects. As dust particles grow in size to form planetesimals, they gradually lose energy due to the influence gas pressure causing these bodies to slow down, resulting in a radial drift inwards.

== The Radial Drift Problem ==
The motion of particles in protoplanetary disks is heavily dependent on their size. As small grains grow and evolve into planetesimals, the drag force they encounter due to gas pressure also increases as the magnitude of this force scales with size. This drag results in a continuous reduction in their orbital velocity. Ultimately, without intervention, these bodies will continue to spiral inward as they grow and become vaporized by the heat of the central star.

This theory insinuates that the growth from solid particles to planetesimals must occur within incredibly short timescales to avoid drifting into the star and allowing them to evolve into the structure of planets we observe today.

The phenomenon of radial drifting presents significant challenges for planet formation, commonly referred to as the Radial Drift Problem or the Radial Drift Barrier. As particles migrate inward during growth, their ability to evolve into planetesimals becomes jeopardized. Several theories have been proposed to address this problem, each exploring different mechanisms that could allow for the formation of planetesimals despite this interference. Some notable proposals being the existence of particle traps around planetary gaps which slows inward drifting, pressure bumps due to gas pressure variations, vortices formations within the disk, and how porous growth on dust grains can affect radial motion.
