= Arthur Friedheim =

Jewish-Russian pianist (1859–1932)

Friedheim in 1912

Arthur Friedheim (Russian: Артур Фридхайм, romanized: Artur Fridkhaym, 26 October [O.S. 14 October] 1859 – 19 October 1932) was a Russian-born concert pianist and composer who was one of Franz Liszt's foremost pupils. One of Friedheim's students was Rildia Bee O'Bryan Cliburn, the mother of 20th-century piano virtuoso Van Cliburn.

== Biography ==
Friedheim was born in Saint Petersburg on 26 October [O.S. 14 October] 1859. He began serious study of music at age eight. He later studied for a year with noted pianist Anton Rubinstein but disapproved of Rubinstein's disorganized teaching methods and went instead to Liszt.

At first Liszt did not like Friedheim's playing, though he admitted the individuality of Friedheim's style. Harold C. Schonberg asserts in his book The Great Pianists that another reason Liszt may have been hesitant was that Friedheim had studied with Rubinstein, of whom Liszt may not have been terribly fond. Friedheim had to play before Liszt several times before becoming accepted as a pupil in 1880. The friendship between them eventually led Liszt to make Friedheim his secretary. Friedheim copied many of Liszt's mannerisms, which were noted by pianist and composer Ferruccio Busoni on hearing Friedheim play in Vienna in 1883. Busoni wrote: "There is a pianist here ... with long hair and a face that looks half severe, half bored. When he plays he comes forward and bows in such a way that his hair covers all his face; then he throws his head back to tidy his mane. Then he sits down with a great deal of fuss, and looks round waiting till the audience is quiet. ... But the loveliest thing of all is to see him during the tuttis of the orchestra. There he has room to show off all his tricks. He examines his nails, considers the audience, thrusts his hands into the air, and does other silly things." However, Busoni viewed Friedheim as an authority on Liszt's playing and played the Don Juan Fantasy, Hexaméron, Norma (S. 394), and Stumme (S. 386) for him in London in December 1897.

Friedheim also gained orchestral experience conducting in theaters and opera houses in Germany. Between 1891 and 1895 Friedheim taught and played in the United States. After that he spent some time in London and until 1904 taught at the Royal Manchester College of Music. He conducted in Munich from 1908 to 1911. He settled in the United States in 1915, teaching at the New York School of Music and Arts, before going to Toronto, Ontario, Canada, in 1921 to become a professor at the Canadian Academy of Music. Before then, he was offered the conductorship of the New York Philharmonic in 1898 and 1911. He was a good conductor but turned down the offer both times, preferring to concentrate on the piano. He died in New York City in 1932.

== Musical works ==
Friedheim's pianism was considered awesome technically but he was most noted for the clarity and repose in his interpretations of Liszt's music. Unfortunately, the best qualities of his playing only survive in a fragmentary manner in the few gramophone recordings he made. He made three recordings for Columbia around 1912. One of these is considered a curiosity—a rendition of the funeral march from Frédéric Chopin's Second Piano Sonata in which Friedheim plays to the end of the trio and, having no more room on the record, simply stops. He was apparently content to record just two-thirds of the piece. He also recorded many piano rolls for the Welte, Hupfeld, and Duo-Art systems.

Friedheim wrote a psychological study of Liszt and many reminiscences, which were collected by his pupil Theodore L. Bullock under the title Life and Liszt. Along with editing the works of Chopin, Friedheim wrote a number of works, although few of them were published and many of the manuscripts are now lost. His operas include The Last Days of Pompeii (not performed), Alexander and Thais and Die Tanzerin; two others, The Christians and Giulia Gonzaga, were left unfinished. He wrote two piano concertos, an orchestral overture A Hero of our Times, a symphonic poem Transitions and a march E pluribus unum.

== Bibliography ==
- Carter, Gerard and Adler, Martin, Liszt Piano Sonata Monographs - Arthur Friedheim's Recently Discovered Roll Recording (Sydney, Wensleydale Press, 2011). ISBN 978-3-86931-795-3
- Carter, Gerard (ed.) and Adler, Martin (ed.), Facsimile of Arthur Friedheim's Edition of Franz Liszt's Sonata in B minor (Sydney, Wensleydale Press, 2011). ISBN 978-3-8442-0890-0
- Friedheim, Arthur, Life and Liszt in Remembering Franz Liszt (New York, Limelight Editions, 1987). ISBN 978-0-87910-113-8
- Hamilton, Kenneth (2008). After the Golden Age. Oxford: Oxford University Press. ISBN 978-0-19-517826-5.
- Ley, Rosamond, ed. (1938). "Letters To His Wife". New York: Da Capo Press. ISBN 0-306-70732-2.
- ed. Sadie, Stanley, The New Grove Dictionary of Music and Musicians, First Edition (London, Macmillan, 1980). ISBN 0-333-23111-2
  - Schonberg, Harold C., The Great Pianists (New York: Simon and Schuster, 1987, 1963). ISBN 0-671-64200-6*Moore, Jerrold Northrop, "Friedheim, Arthur"
