= Thomas Michael O'Neil =

American physicist

- Born: September 2, 1940 (age 85); Hibbing, Minnesota
- Education: California State University, Long Beach (B.S.); University of California, San Diego (M.S., Ph.D.)
- Awards: Sloan Fellowship (1971); John Dawson Award (1991); James Clerk Maxwell Prize for Plasma Physics (1996)
- Scientific career
- Fields: Plasma physics
- Institutions: General Atomics, UCSD
- Thesis: Collisionless damping of nonlinear plasma oscillations (1965)
- Doctoral advisor: Norman Rostoker

Thomas Michael O'Neil (born September 2, 1940) is an American physicist who specializes in plasma physics.

== Early life and career ==
O’Neil obtained his bachelor's degree at California State University, Long Beach in 1962, and then his master's degree and Ph.D. at the University of California, San Diego (UCSD) in 1964 and 1965 respectively. From 1965 to 1967, he was a scientist at General Atomics and from 1967 at UCSD as an assistant professor and later a professor. From 1980 to 1984, he was on the advisory board of the Institute of Fusion Studies at the University of Texas at Austin.

== Honors and awards ==
O'Neil is a fellow of the American Physical Society. In 1971, O'Neil was awarded the Sloan Research Fellowship by the Alfred P. Sloan Foundation. From 1979 to 1983, he was co-editor of the Physical Review Letters. In 1991, he received the John Dawson Award for Excellence in Plasma Physics Research with John Malmberg and Charles Driscoll for their studies of non-neutral plasmas. There is a video, filmed in 1987, where John Malmberg and O'Neil describe their research.

In 1996, he received the James Clerk Maxwell Prize for Plasma Physics for "seminal contributions to plasma theory, including extension of Landau damping to the nonlinear regime and demonstration of the importance of particle trapping; discovery of the plasma-wave echo; and pioneering studies of the confinement, transport, and thermal equilibria of non-neutral plasmas, liquids and crystals. His theoretical work and active guidance of experiments with trapped, non-neutral plasmas provide much of the foundation for this branch of plasma physics".
