= Meitner–Hupfeld effect =

The Meitner–Hupfeld effect, named after Lise Meitner and Hans-Hermann Hupfeld, is an anomalously large scattering of gamma rays by heavy elements. The effect was later explained by a broad theory from which evolved the Standard Model, a theory for explaining the structure of the atomic nucleus. The anomalous gamma-ray behaviour was eventually ascribed to electron–positron pair production and annihilation.

Although Meitner was recognised for her work, Hupfeld's contribution is largely ignored, and little or no account of his life exists.

== See also ==
- Pair production
- Electron-positron annihilation
