= Hupfeld =

Hupfeld is a surname. Notable people with the surname include:

- Hans-Hermann Hupfeld, German physicist
- Herman Hupfeld, American songwriter
- Hermann Hupfeld, German Orientalist and Biblical commentator
- Ludwig Hupfeld, German piano maker (and his company Ludwig Hupfeld, AG, Leipzig)
