= Hans-Hermann Hupfeld =

German physicist

- Born: Gustav Theodor Hans Hermann Hupfeld; November 28, 1905; Klein-Varchow, Mecklenburg, Germany
- Died: November 11, 1942 (aged 36); Nisch Ssaniba, North Ossetia, Caucasus
- Known for: Meitner–Hupfeld effect
- Scientific career
- Fields: Physics
- Institutions: Kaiser Wilhelm Institut

Gustav Theodor Hans Hermann Hupfeld (November 28, 1905 – November 11, 1942) was a German physicist known for his work on the scattering of gamma rays.

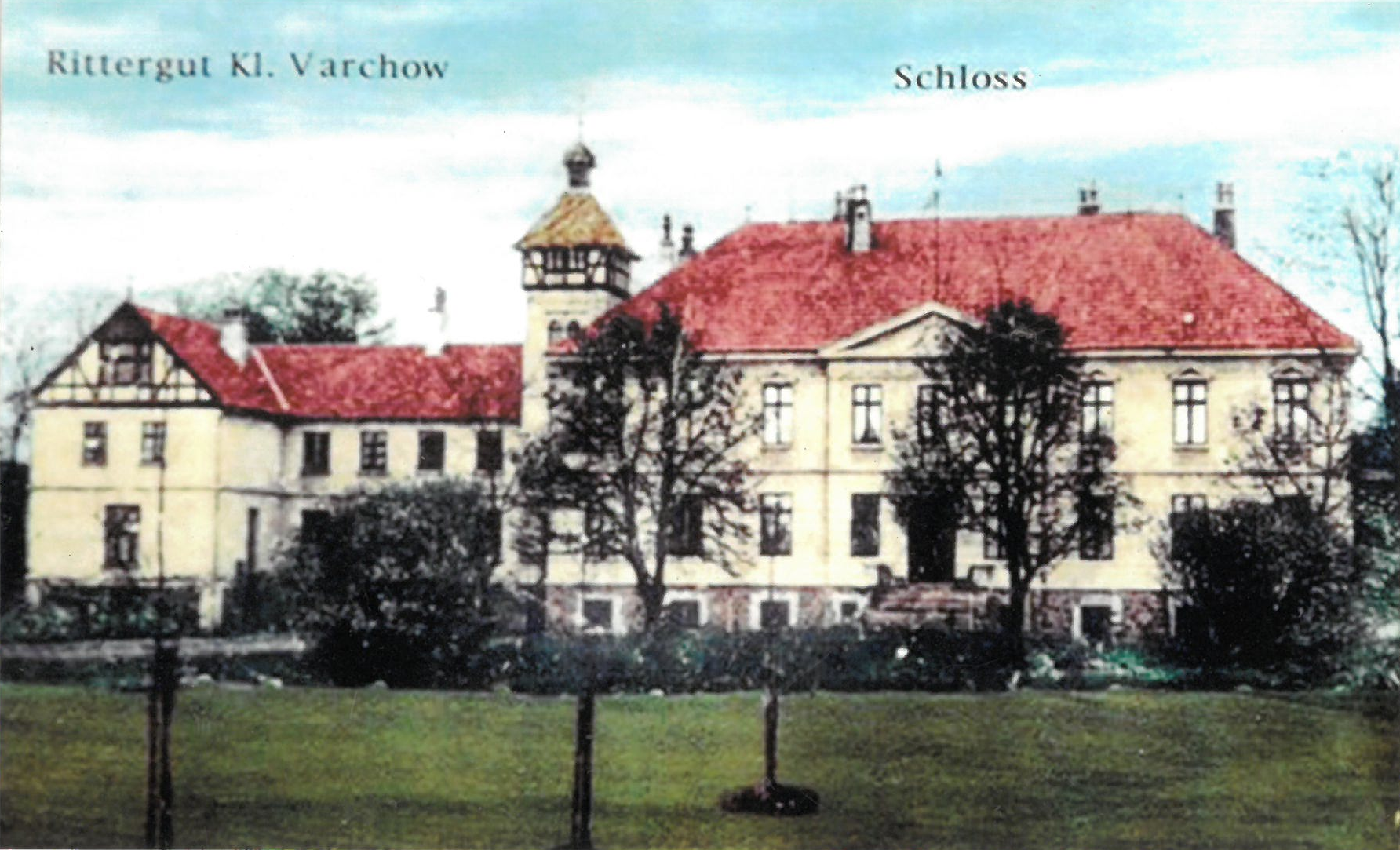
Hupfeld's family state, birthplace of Hans-Hermann Hupfeld, physicist.

== Early career ==
Hans-Hermann Hupfeld was born on his parents' farm in Klein-Varchow, Mecklenburg, Germany. He obtained a degree in physics and worked at the Kaiser Wilhelm Institut, Berlin Dahlem, from 1929 until 1932 with Prof. Otto Hahn and Prof. Lise Meitner. His research during that time resulted in the discovery of the so-called Meitner–Hupfeld effect.

The Meitner–Hupfeld effect is an anomalously large scattering of gamma rays by heavy elements. Later on, the Meitner–Hupfeld effect was explained by a broad theory from which evolved the Standard Model, a theory for explaining the structure of the atomic nucleus. The anomalous gamma-ray behavior was eventually ascribed to electron–positron pair production and annihilation.

Although Professor Meitner was recognized for her work, Hupfeld is usually ignored, and little or no account of his life exists. His name is misspelled as Heinz Hupfeld, instead of Hans-Hermann Hupfeld in publications from the early '30s.

== Later career ==
Disgruntled by lack of recognition, Hupfeld left the Kaiser Wilhelm Institut in 1932 (now known as the Max Planck Society) in Berlin and went, because of Germany's bad economic situation at that time, to help in the construction of buildings using a sustainable earthen technology known as the "Dunne loam loaf" technique, pioneered in Europe by Pastor Gustav von Bodelschwingh, Ruhrgebiet, Germany. From there he went to the recently founded "Freiwilliger Arbeitsdienst" (FAD) also created by v. Bodelschwingh, but was very suddenly incorporated by the Nazi regime into the "Reichsarbeitsdienst" (RAD) at Schloss Simmenau, High Silesia and Oppeln/OS (after World War II, known as Opole, Poland). From there he left to serve as a Reserve Officer until his death at the age of 36 during World War II in the Russian Caucasus. According to letters sent by the German army to his widow, he was killed on November 11, 1942, in Nisch Ssaniba, North Ossetia, Caucasus.

Hupfeld was survived by his wife and three daughters who later emigrated to Brazil.

== See also ==
- Pair production
- Electron–positron annihilation
