= Positron annihilation spectroscopy =

Non-destructive spectroscopy

Positron annihilation spectroscopy (PAS) or sometimes specifically referred to as positron annihilation lifetime spectroscopy (PALS) is a non-destructive spectroscopy technique to study voids and defects in solids.

== Theory ==
A Feynman diagram of an electron and positron annihilating into a photon.

The technique operates on the principle that a positron or positronium will annihilate through interaction with electrons. This annihilation releases gamma rays that can be detected; the time between emission of positrons from a radioactive source and detection of gamma rays due to annihilation corresponds to the lifetime of positron or positronium.

When positrons are injected into a solid body, they interact in some manner with the electrons in that species. For solids containing free electrons (such as metals or semiconductors), the implanted positrons annihilate rapidly unless voids such as vacancy defects are present. If voids are available, positrons will reside in them and annihilate less rapidly than in the bulk of the material, on time scales up to ~1 ns. For insulators such as polymers or zeolites, implanted positrons interact with electrons in the material to form positronium.

Positronium is a metastable hydrogen-like bound state of an electron and a positron which can exist in two spin states. Para-positronium, p-Ps, is a singlet state (the positron and electron spins are anti-parallel) with a characteristic self-annihilation lifetime of 125 ps in vacuum. Ortho-positronium, o-Ps, is a triplet state (the positron and electron spins are parallel) with a characteristic self-annihilation lifetime of 142 ns in vacuum. In molecular materials, the lifetime of o-Ps is environment dependent and it delivers information pertaining to the size of the void in which it resides. Ps can pick up a molecular electron with an opposite spin to that of the positron, leading to a reduction of the o-Ps lifetime from 142 ns to 1-4 ns (depending on the size of the free volume in which it resides). The size of the molecular free volume can be derived from the o-Ps lifetime via the semi-empirical Tao-Eldrup model.

While the PALS is successful in examining local free volumes, it still needs to employ data from combined methods in order to yield free volume fractions. Even approaches to obtain fractional free volume from the PALS data that claim to be independent on other experiments, such as PVT measurements, they still do employ theoretical considerations, such as iso-free-volume amount from Simha-Boyer theory. A convenient emerging method for obtaining free volume amounts in an independent manner are computer simulations; these can be combined with the PALS measurements and help to interpret the PALS measurements.

Pore structure in insulators can be determined using the quantum mechanical Tao-Eldrup model and extensions thereof. By changing the temperature at which a sample is analyzed, the pore structure can be fit to a model where positronium is confined in one, two, or three dimensions. However, interconnected pores result in averaged lifetimes that cannot distinguish between smooth channels or channels having smaller, open, peripheral pores due to energetically favored positronium diffusion from small to larger pores.

The behavior of positrons in molecules or condensed matter is nontrivial due to the strong correlation between electrons and positrons. Even the simplest case, that of a single positron immersed in a homogeneous gas of electrons, has proved to be a significant challenge for theory. The positron attracts electrons to it, increasing the contact density and hence enhancing the annihilation rate. Furthermore, the momentum density of annihilating electron-positron pairs is enhanced near the Fermi surface. Theoretical approaches used to study this problem have included the Tamm-Dancoff approximation, Fermi and perturbed hypernetted chain approximations, density functional theory methods and quantum Monte Carlo.

== Implementation ==
The experiment itself involves having a radioactive positron source (often ^{22}Na) situated near the analyte. Positrons are emitted near-simultaneously with gamma rays. These gamma rays are detected by a nearby scintillator.
