= Positron =

Antiparticle of the electron

Positron (antielectron)
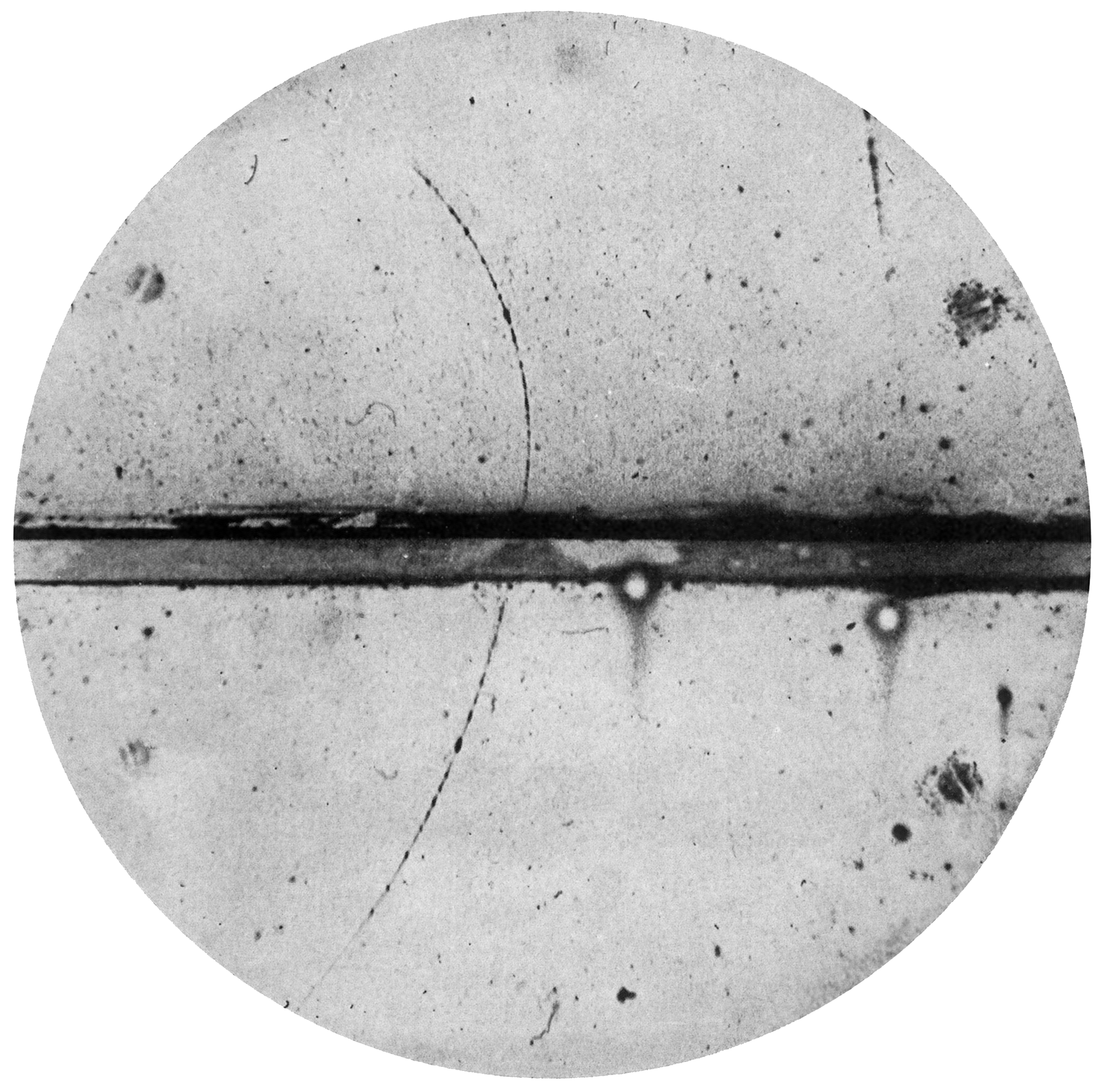
- Cloud chamber photograph by C. D. Anderson of the first positron ever identified. A 6 mm lead plate separates the chamber. The deflection and direction of the particle's ion trail indicate that the particle is a positron.
- Composition: Elementary particle
- Statistics: Fermionic
- Generation: First
- Interactions: Gravity, electromagnetic, weak
- Symbol: e^{+}, β^{+}
- Antiparticle: Electron
- Theorized: Paul Dirac (1928)
- Discovered: Carl D. Anderson (1932)
- Mass: m_{e} 9.1093837139(28)×10^{−31} kg 5.485799090441(97)×10^{−4} Da; 0.51099895069(16) MeV/c^{2}
- Mean lifetime: stable (same as electron)
- Electric charge: +1 e +1.602176634×10^{−19} C
- Spin: 1/2 ħ (same as electron)
- Weak isospin: LH: 0, RH: 1/2

The positron or antielectron is the particle with an electric charge of +1e, a spin of 1/2 ħ (the same as the electron), and the same mass as an electron. It is the antiparticle (antimatter counterpart) of the electron. When a positron collides with an electron, annihilation occurs. If this collision occurs at low energies, it results in the production of two or more photons.

Positrons can be created by positron emission radioactive decay (through weak interactions), or by pair production from a sufficiently energetic photon which is interacting with an atom in a material.

== History ==
=== Theory ===
In 1928, Paul Dirac published a paper proposing that electrons can have both a positive and negative charge. This paper introduced the Dirac equation, a unification of quantum mechanics, special relativity, and the then-new concept of electron spin to explain the Zeeman effect. The paper did not explicitly predict a new particle but did allow for electrons having either positive or negative energy as solutions. Hermann Weyl then published a paper discussing the mathematical implications of the negative energy solution. The positive-energy solution explained experimental results, but Dirac was puzzled by the equally valid negative-energy solution that the mathematical model allowed. Quantum mechanics did not allow the negative energy solution to simply be ignored, as classical mechanics often did in such equations; the dual solution implied the possibility of an electron spontaneously jumping between positive and negative energy states. However, no such transition had yet been observed experimentally.

Dirac wrote a follow-up paper in December 1929 that attempted to explain the unavoidable negative-energy solution for the relativistic electron. He argued that "... an electron with negative energy moves in an external [electromagnetic] field as though it carries a positive charge." He further asserted that all of space could be regarded as a "sea" of negative energy states that were filled, so as to prevent electrons jumping between positive energy states (negative electric charge) and negative energy states (positive charge). The paper also explored the possibility of the proton being an island in this sea, and that it might actually be a negative-energy electron. Dirac acknowledged that the proton having a much greater mass than the electron was a problem, but expressed "hope" that a future theory would resolve the issue.

Robert Oppenheimer argued strongly against the proton being the negative-energy electron solution to Dirac's equation. He asserted that if it were, the hydrogen atom would rapidly self-destruct. Weyl in 1931 showed that the negative-energy electron must have the same mass as that of the positive-energy electron. Persuaded by Oppenheimer's and Weyl's argument, Dirac published a paper in 1931 that predicted the existence of an as-yet-unobserved particle that he called an "anti-electron" that would have the same mass and the opposite charge as an electron and that would mutually annihilate upon contact with an electron.

Ernst Stueckelberg, and later Richard Feynman, proposed an interpretation of the positron as an electron moving backward in time, reinterpreting the negative-energy solutions of the Dirac equation. Electrons moving backward in time would have a positive electric charge. John Archibald Wheeler invoked this concept to explain the identical properties shared by all electrons, suggesting that "they are all the same electron" with a complex, self-intersecting worldline. Yoichiro Nambu later applied it to all production and annihilation of particle-antiparticle pairs, stating that "the eventual creation and annihilation of pairs that may occur now and then is no creation or annihilation, but only a change of direction of moving particles, from the past to the future, or from the future to the past." The backwards in time point of view is nowadays accepted as completely equivalent to other pictures, but it does not have anything to do with the macroscopic terms "cause" and "effect", which do not appear in a microscopic physical description.

=== Experimental clues and discovery ===
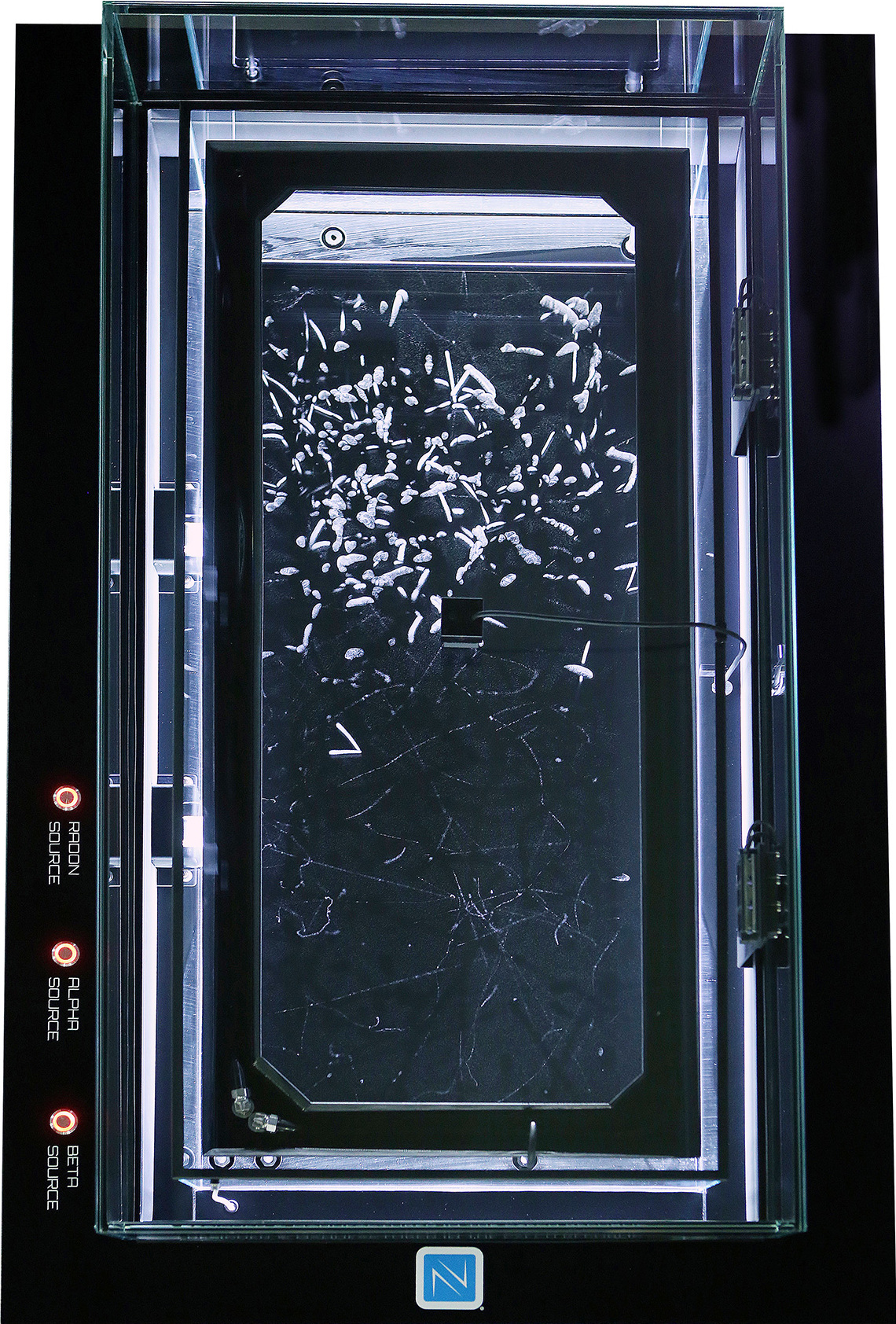
Wilson cloud chambers used to be very important particle detectors in the early days of particle physics. They were used in the discovery of the positron, muon, and kaon.

Beginning in 1923, while using a Wilson cloud chamber to study the Compton effect, Dmitri Skobeltsyn observed tracks that acted like electrons but curved in the opposite direction in an applied magnetic field. Skobeltsyn presented photographs with this phenomenon in a conference in the University of Cambridge, on 23–27 July 1928. Similar photographic evidence had been seen by Irene and Frederic Joliot-Curie and others but no one at the time had an explanation for these anomalous tracks. Skobeltsyn paved the way for the eventual discovery of the positron by two important contributions: adding a magnetic field to his cloud chamber (in 1925), and by discovering charged particle cosmic rays, for which he is credited in Carl David Anderson's Nobel lecture.

Likewise, in 1929 Chung-Yao Chao, a Chinese graduate student at Caltech, noticed some anomalous results that indicated particles behaving like electrons, but with a positive charge, though the results were inconclusive and the phenomenon was not pursued. Fifty years later, Anderson acknowledged that his discovery was inspired by the work of Chao, his Caltech classmate. Anderson used the same radioactive source but adopted a magnet cloud chamber which allowed him to see the anti-electron tracks.

Anderson discovered the positron on 2 August 1932, for which he won the Nobel Prize for Physics in 1936. Anderson did not coin the term positron, but allowed it at the suggestion of the Physical Review journal editor to whom he submitted his discovery paper in late 1932. The positron was the first evidence of antimatter and was discovered when Anderson allowed cosmic rays to pass through a cloud chamber and a lead plate. A magnet surrounded this apparatus, causing particles to bend in different directions based on their electric charge. The ion trail left by each positron appeared on the photographic plate with a curvature matching the mass-to-charge ratio of an electron, but in a direction that showed its charge was positive.

Anderson wrote in retrospect that the positron could have been discovered earlier based on Chung-Yao Chao's work, if only it had been followed up on. Frédéric and Irène Joliot-Curie in Paris had evidence of positrons in old photographs when Anderson's results came out, but they had dismissed them as protons.

The positron had also been contemporaneously discovered by Patrick Blackett and Giuseppe Occhialini at the Cavendish Laboratory in 1932. Blackett and Occhialini had delayed publication to obtain more solid evidence, so Anderson was able to publish the discovery first.

== Natural production ==
NASA’s Fermi Gamma-ray Space Telescope has discovered a faint but sprawling gamma ray glow around the pulsar Geminga. Analysis of the halo is consistent with the idea that pulsars could be responsible for the observed excess of positron cosmic particles arriving from beyond the Solar System.

Positrons are produced, together with neutrinos naturally in β^{+} decays of naturally occurring radioactive isotopes (for example, potassium-40) and in interactions of gamma quanta (emitted by radioactive nuclei) with matter. Antineutrinos are another kind of antiparticle produced by natural radioactivity (β^{−} decay). Many different kinds of antiparticles are also produced by (and contained in) cosmic rays. In research published in 2011 by the American Astronomical Society, positrons were discovered originating above thunderstorm clouds; positrons are produced in gamma-ray flashes created by electrons accelerated by strong electric fields in the clouds. Antiprotons have also been found to exist in the Van Allen Belts around the Earth by the PAMELA module.

Antiparticles, of which the most common are antineutrinos and positrons due to their low mass, are also produced in any environment with a sufficiently high temperature (mean particle energy greater than the pair production threshold). During the period of baryogenesis, when the universe was extremely hot and dense, matter and antimatter were continually produced and annihilated. The presence of remaining matter, and absence of detectable remaining antimatter, also called baryon asymmetry, is attributed to CP-violation: a violation of the CP-symmetry relating matter to antimatter. The exact mechanism of this violation during baryogenesis remains a mystery.

Positron production from radioactive β^{+} decay can be considered both artificial and natural production, as the generation of the radioisotope can be natural or artificial. Perhaps the best known naturally occurring radioisotope which produces positrons is potassium-40, a long-lived isotope of potassium which occurs as a primordial isotope of potassium. Even though it is a small percentage of potassium (0.0117%), it is the single most abundant radioisotope in the human body. In a human body of 70 kg (150 lb) mass, about 4,400 nuclei of ^{40}K decay per second. The activity of natural potassium is 31 Bq/g. About 0.001% of these ^{40}K decays produce about 4,000 natural positrons per day in the human body. These positrons soon find an electron, undergo annihilation, and produce pairs of 511 keV photons, in a process similar (but much lower intensity) to that which happens during a PET scan nuclear medicine procedure.

Recent observations indicate black holes and neutron stars produce vast amounts of positron–electron plasma in astrophysical jets. Large clouds of positron–electron plasma have also been associated with neutron stars.

=== Observation in cosmic rays ===
Satellite experiments have found evidence of positrons (as well as a few antiprotons) in primary cosmic rays, amounting to less than 1% of the particles in primary cosmic rays. However, the fraction of positrons in cosmic rays has been measured more recently with improved accuracy, especially at much higher energy levels, and the fraction of positrons has been seen to be greater in these higher energy cosmic rays.

These do not appear to be the products of large amounts of antimatter from the Big Bang, or indeed complex antimatter in the universe (evidence for which is lacking, see below). Rather, the antimatter in cosmic rays appear to consist of only these two elementary particles. Recent theories suggest the source of such positrons may come from annihilation of dark matter particles, acceleration of positrons to high energies in astrophysical objects, and production of high energy positrons in the interactions of cosmic ray nuclei with interstellar gas.

Preliminary results from the presently operating Alpha Magnetic Spectrometer (AMS-02) on board the International Space Station show that positrons in the cosmic rays arrive with no directionality, and with energies that range from 0.5 GeV to 500 GeV. Positron fraction peaks at a maximum of about 16% of total electron+positron events, around an energy of 275 ± 32 GeV. At higher energies, up to 500 GeV, the ratio of positrons to electrons begins to fall again. The absolute flux of positrons also begins to fall before 500 GeV, but peaks at energies far higher than electron energies, which peak about 10 GeV. These results on interpretation have been suggested to be due to positron production in annihilation events of massive dark matter particles.

Positrons, like anti-protons, do not appear to originate from any hypothetical "antimatter" regions of the universe. On the contrary, there is no evidence of complex antimatter atomic nuclei, such as antihelium nuclei (i.e., anti-alpha particles), in cosmic rays. These are actively being searched for. A prototype of the AMS-02 designated AMS-01, was flown into space aboard the Space Shuttle Discovery on STS-91 in June 1998. By not detecting any antihelium at all, the AMS-01 established an upper limit of 1.1×10^{−6} for the antihelium to helium flux ratio.

== Artificial production ==
Physicists at the Lawrence Livermore National Laboratory in California have used a short, ultra-intense laser to irradiate a millimeter-thick gold target and produce more than 100 billion positrons. Presently significant lab production of 5 MeV positron–electron beams allows investigation of multiple characteristics such as how different elements react to 5 MeV positron interactions or impacts, how energy is transferred to particles, and the shock effect of gamma-ray bursts.

In 2023, a collaboration between CERN and University of Oxford performed an experiment at the HiRadMat facility in which nano-second duration beams of electron-positron pairs were produced containing more than 10 trillion electron-positron pairs, so creating the first 'pair plasma' in the laboratory with sufficient density to support collective plasma behavior. Future experiments offer the possibility to study physics relevant to extreme astrophysical environments where copious electron-positron pairs are generated, such as gamma-ray bursts, fast radio bursts and blazar jets.

== Applications ==
Certain kinds of particle accelerator experiments involve colliding positrons and electrons at relativistic speeds. The high impact energy and the mutual annihilation of these matter/antimatter opposites create a fountain of diverse subatomic particles. Physicists study the results of these collisions to test theoretical predictions and to search for new kinds of particles.

The ALPHA experiment combines positrons with antiprotons to study properties of antihydrogen.

Gamma rays, emitted indirectly by a positron-emitting radionuclide (tracer), are detected in positron emission tomography (PET) scanners used in hospitals. PET scanners create detailed three-dimensional images of metabolic activity within the human body.

An experimental tool called positron annihilation spectroscopy (PAS) is used in materials research to detect variations in density, defects, displacements, or even voids, within a solid material.

== See also ==
- Beta particle
- Buffer-gas trap
- Electron hole
- List of particles
- Positronium
- Positronic brain
