= Giovanni Caselli =

Italian physicist (1815–1891)

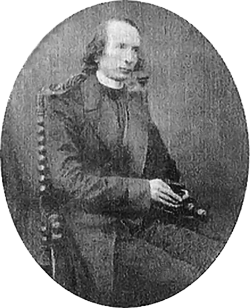
- Giovanni Caselli
- Born: 25 April 1815; Siena, Italy
- Died: 8 June 1891 (aged 76); Florence, Italy
- Education: University of Florence
- Occupation: inventor
- Known for: pantelegraph

Giovanni Caselli (8 June 1815 – 25 April 1891) was an Italian priest, inventor, and physicist. He studied electricity and magnetism as a child which led to his invention of the pantelegraph (also known as the universal telegraph or all-purpose telegraph), the forerunner of the fax machine. The world's first practical operating facsimile machine ("fax") system put into use was by Caselli. He had worldwide patents on his system. His technology idea was further developed into today's analog television.

Caselli was a student and professor at the University of Florence in Italy. He started a technical journal that explained physics in layman's terms. For his pantelegraph technology he was awarded the Legion of Honor by Napoleon III of France. Parisian scientists and engineers started the Pantelegraph Society to exchange ideas about the pantelegraph and the associated synchronizing apparatus, in order to get the sending and receiving mechanisms to work together properly.

== Early life ==
Caselli was born in the town of Siena, Italy on 25 April 1815. As a child, he was tutored in Florence by Italian physicist Leopoldo Nobili. These studies involved electrochemistry, electromagnetism, electricity and magnetism. He became a priest in 1836. Caselli became a student at the University of Florence and studied literature, history, science, and religion. He lived in Parma from 1841 to 1848 and was a teacher for the sons of the Marquis of the basilica of San Vitale.

He participated in the insurrection of 1848 for the takeover of Duchy of Parma to be part of Piedmont, and was expelled from the area for his actions during this political violence. He returned to Florence where he became a professor in physics at the University of Florence in 1849. In 1851, he founded the technical journal La Ricreazione that explained physics, written in layman's terms, to the public. He studied electricity and magnetism, and he created the pantelegraph between 1855 and 1861, which was the precursor of the fax machine.

=== Pantelegraph ===
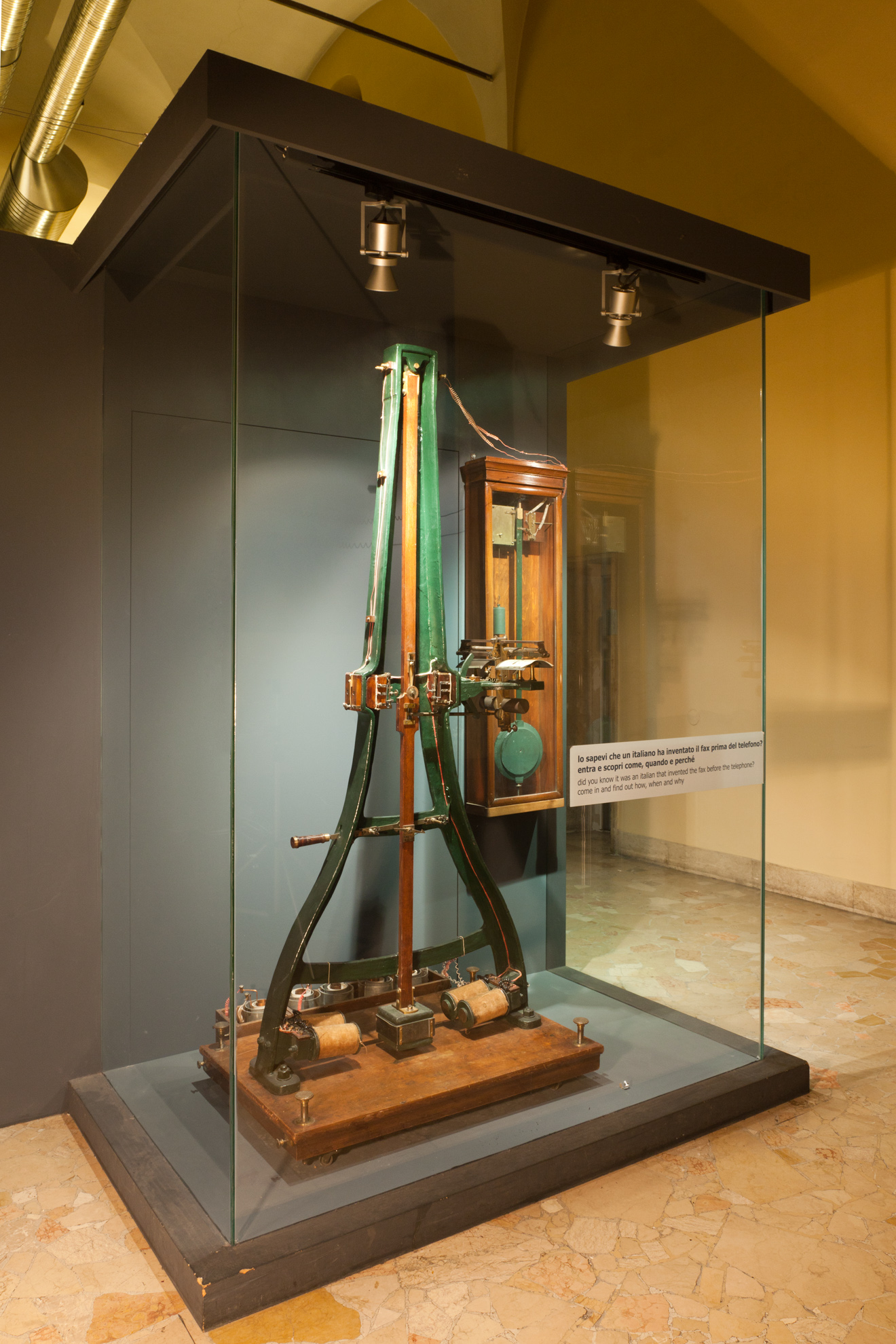
Pantèlègraph by Giovanni Caselli, 1933 replica exhibited at the Museo nazionale della scienza e della tecnologia Leonardo da Vinci, Milan.

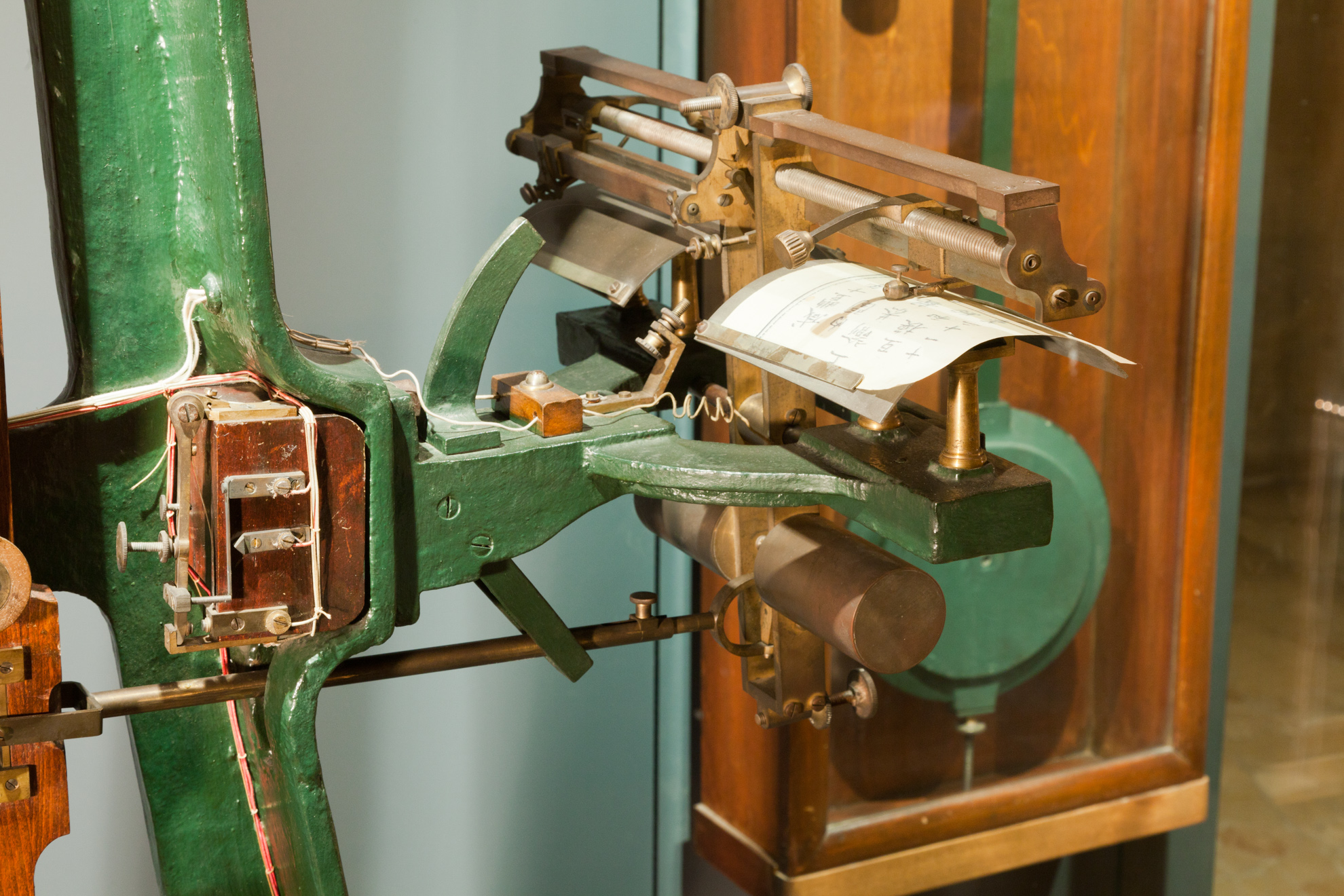
Detail of the Pantèlègraph by Giovanni Caselli, 1933 replica, Museo nazionale della scienza e della tecnologia Leonardo da Vinci, Milan.

Pantèlègraph is a portmanteau from pantograph, an instrument that copies handwritten words and sketches, plus "telegraph", an electrical system that sends messages through a normal wire over long distances and that can be mechanically synced. When he was teaching at the University of Florence, Caselli devoted much of his research to the technology of telegraphic transmission of sketches as well as handwritten words. Inventor Alexander Bain was working on this technology with his facsimile machine, as was physicist Frederick Bakewell. The major problem of the time was to get perfect synchronization between the transmitting and receiving parts so they would work together correctly. Caselli developed an electrochemical technology with a "synchronizing apparatus" (regulating clock) to make the sending and receiving mechanisms work together that was far superior to any technology Bain or Bakewell had.

The technique involves an image made using non-conductive ink on a piece of tin foil. A stylus in the electrical path of the tin foil is passed over the foil where it delicately touches it. The stylus passes evenly with scans slightly apart. Then what happens is that electricity conducts where there is no ink contacting the stylus and does not where there is ink in between. This causes spurts of electricity matching the image as it is being scanned. The signals are then sent along a long-distance telegraph line. The receiving apparatus at the other end has an electrical stylus and draws blue ink on white paper, reproducing the image line-by-line. The resulting document is a fac simile (Latin, "make similar") of the original image scanned.

Caselli made a prototype of his system by 1856 and presented it to Leopold II, Grand Duke of Tuscany, in a demonstration that used telegraph lines. The Duke was so impressed with Caselli's device that the duke financed Caselli's experiments. When the Duke's enthusiasm waned, Caselli moved to Paris to introduce his invention to Napoleon III. Napoleon immediately became an enthusiastic admirer of the technology. Caselli perfected his pantelegraph (also known as the autotelegraph) between 1857 and 1861 in Paris under the leadership of French inventor and engineer Paul-Gustave Froment. The world's first practical operating facsimile machine ("fax") system put into use was by Caselli and utilized a scanning technology Froment devised.

In 1858 Caselli's improved version was demonstrated by French physicist Alexandre-Edmond Becquerel at the French Academy of Sciences in Paris. Napoleon saw 1860 a demonstration given of Caselli's pantelegraph and then put in an order for the operation of it within the French telegraph network that started about a year later in the country. Caselli had access to not only the French telegraph lines for his pantelegraph facsimile machine technology, but finances were provided by Napoleon. A test was done successfully then between Paris and Amiens with the signature of composer Gioacchino Rossini as the image sent, and it was received 87 miles (140 km) away recognizable.

Caselli did testing in 1863 between Paris and Marseille, a distance of 800 kilometres (500 mi), which turned out to be successful. French law was enacted in 1864 for it to be officially used on the French telegraph network that was normally used just for telegraph messages. In 1865, operations commenced on a Paris to Lyon line, and this line was extended to Marseille in 1867. Although rudimentary, Caselli had invented the first commercial fax system and the birth of the fax cover sheet. The mid-nineteenth century pantelegraph took about two minutes to transmit a sheet of paper 1.1 inches (28 mm) by 4.5 inches (110 mm) with 25 handwritten words on it. The early twentieth century modern fax machine took about one minute to transmit a sheet of paper 11 inches (280 mm) by 8.5 inches (220 mm) with 250 handwritten words on it.

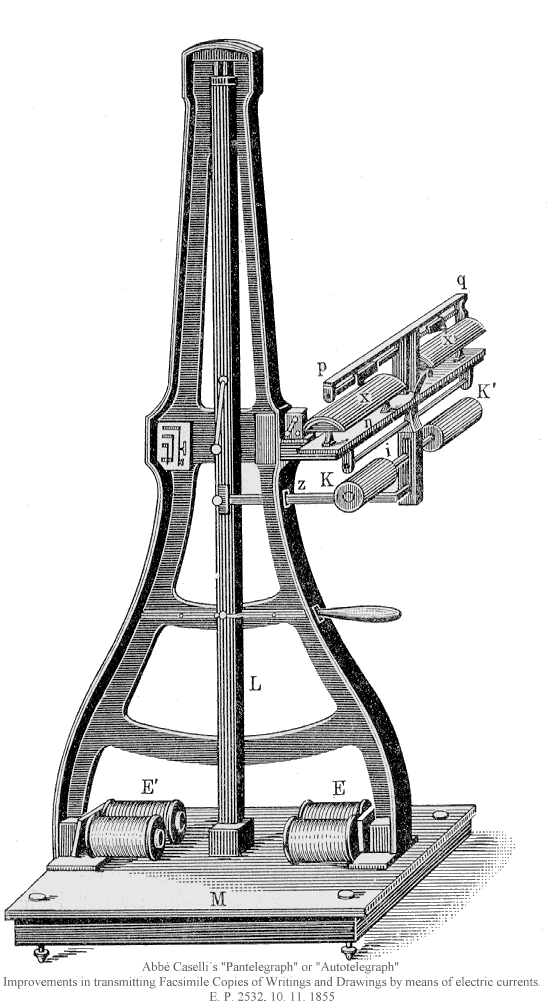
Caselli's pantelegraph patented in 1861

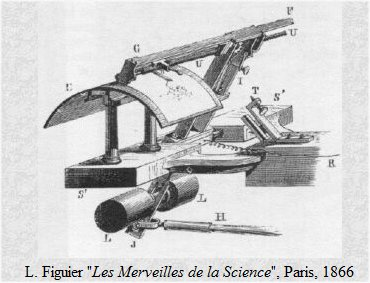
Pantelegraph "reading" tinfoil mechanism

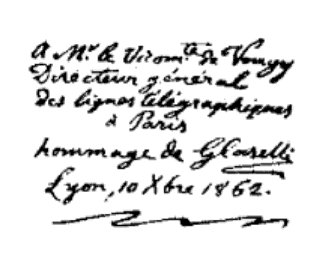
Pantelegraph image, Paris to Lyons on 10 Feb 1862

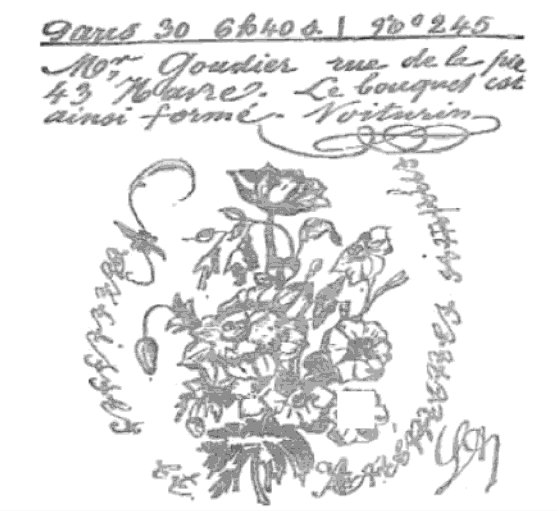
Caselli pantelegraph images were blue ink

== Later life and legacy ==
Caselli applied in 1861 for a patent for his pantélégraphe in Europe and ultimately received European patent number 2,532 for the device. He applied for a patent in 1863 in the United States and it received patent number 37,563. Caselli successfully demonstrated his pantelegraph at the 1861 Florence Exhibition to an audience which had the King of Italy, King Victor Emmanuel. Napoleon visited Caselli at his workshop in 1860 to see a demonstration on how the machine worked. Napoleon was impressed on how well Caselli's apparatus worked and granted him permission to use the French telegraph lines for trials to develop out the machine further. In 1861, Caselli officially registered his invention as a patent. It was in full-scale operation by 1865 between Paris and Lyon. Because of the communication service the pantelegraph did Caselli was hailed as a hero for coming up with the technology and Napoleon bestowed the Legion of Honor upon him.

England had an experimental line in 1863 between the cities of London and Liverpool for a four-month period to test the operation of the device. The French State Legislature Council in 1867 authorized an electrical line between Paris and the town of Marseille to be permanently installed to run a pantelegraph. Napoleon bought Caselli's pantelegraph as a public service and put it into place for the transmission of images from Paris to Lyon. It was in place until Napoleon's defeat in the Battle of Sedan (1870).

Russian Tsar Alexander II put an experimental service in place between his palaces in Saint Petersburg and Moscow between 1861 and 1865. In the first year of operation of the pantelegraph, the system transmitted almost 5,000 faxes, with a peak of faxes being sent at the rate of 110 per hour. In spite of all this, the technology developed too slowly to make it fully reliable. Caselli ultimately gave up on his invention and moved from Paris back to Florence, where he died in 1891. The majority of Caselli's patents, letters, and proofs of teleautographic transmissions are nowadays kept at the municipal library of Siena in Tuscany, Italy, and some can be found in the archives of the Museo Galileo in Florence.

Caselli's scanning technology became popular again in the late nineteenth and early twentieth century. English physicist and inventor Shelford Bidwell constructed the phototelegraph in 1881 that scanned and transmitted images using selenium photocells. German physicist Arthur Korn in the early 1900s developed a practical mechanical television system, known as the Bildtelegraph, that transmitted photographs and fingerprints of criminals. In the early 1900s, French photographer and engineer Édouard Belin invented a phototelegraphic apparatus called the Bélinographe (télestéréographe), which was a system for receiving photographs over telephone wires and was used by newspapers. His system was used beginning in 1928 by French radio stations to broadcast scanned photographs over airwaves. In 1923, Richard H. Ranger, engineer of Radio Corporation of America, invented the wireless photoradiogram radio facsimile that was able to scan and send images of pictures and signed documents across the Atlantic Ocean, between England and the United States. Herbert E. Ives, television engineer of AT&T, designed a system in 1927 that transmitted live scanned images of a person's face using electronic "electric eyes" mounted in a cabinet. This was a forerunner of the movable studio television camera and the hand-held camcorder.

== Sources ==
- Beyer, Rick (2003). Greatest Stories Never Told. New York City: Harper Collins. ISBN 9780060014018.
- Colt, Samuel (2007). Inventors and Inventions. Tarrytown, New York: MTM Publishing. ISBN 978-0-7614-7763-1.
- Huurdeman, Anton A. (2003). The worldwide history of telecommunications. Chicago, Illinois: Wiley-IEEE. ISBN 0-471-20505-2.
- Morrison, Heather S. (2015). Inventors of Communications Technology. Chicago, Illinois: Cavendish Square Publishing. ISBN 9781502606563.
- Peck, Janice (2013). The Handbook of Communication History. Chicago, Illinois: Tayloy & Francis. ISBN 9781136514319.
- Sanders, Lloyd (1887). Celebrities of the Century. New York City: Cassell & Company. OCLC 1013254536.
- Sarkar, Tapan K. (2006). History of wireless. Chicago, Illinois: John Wiley and Sons. ISBN 0-471-71814-9.
- Schiffer, Michael B. (2008). Power Struggles. Chicago, Illinois: MIT Press. ISBN 978-0-262-19582-9.
- Webb, Simon (2019). World of Victorian Steampunk / Steam Planes & Radiophone. Chicago, Illinois: Pen & Sword Books. ISBN 9781526732866.
- Wei, James (2012). Great Inventions that Changed the World. New York, New York: Wiley Publication. ISBN 9781118342732.
