= Arthur Korn =

German physicist and mathematician (1870–1945)

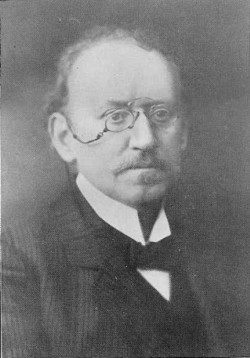
- Born: 20 May 1870; Breslau, Kingdom of Prussia (now Wrocław, Poland)
- Died: 22 December 1945 (aged 75); Jersey City, New Jersey, US
- Occupations: Physicist, mathematician, Inventor

Arthur Korn (20 May 1870 – 21 December/22 December 1945) was a German physicist, mathematician and inventor. He was involved in the development of the fax machine, specifically the transmission of photographs or telephotography, known as the Bildtelegraph, related to early attempts at developing a practical mechanical television system.

== Life ==
Born in Breslau, Korn was the son of a Jewish couple, Moritz and Malwine Schottlaender. He attended gymnasia in Breslau and Berlin. He then studied physics and mathematics at Leipzig University at the age of 15, from where he graduated in 1890. Afterwards, he studied at the Friedrich Wilhelm University of Berlin, the University of Paris, the University of London, and the University of Würzburg. In 1895, he became a lecturer in law at the Ludwig-Maximilians-Universität München, and was appointed professor in 1903. In 1914, he accepted the chair of physics at Technische Universität Berlin.

Korn, being of Jewish descent, was dismissed from his post in 1935 with the rise of the Nazi Party. In 1939, he left Germany with his family and moved to the United States, entering via Mexico. There, he took the chair in physics and mathematics at Stevens Institute of Technology in Hoboken, New Jersey. He died in Jersey City, New Jersey, in 1945.

== Telecommunication pioneer ==
Korn experimented and wrote on long-distance photography, the phototelautograph. He pioneered the use of light sensitive selenium cells which supplanted the function of the stylus, and used a Nernst lamp as a light source. On 17 October 1906, he transmitted a photograph of Crown Prince William over a distance of 1800 km.

At a 1913 conference in Vienna, Korn demonstrated the first successful visual telegraphic transmission of a cinematic recording. Under heavy media attention in 1923, he successfully transmitted an image of Pope Pius XI across the Atlantic Ocean, from Rome to Bar Harbor, Maine, the picture being hailed as a "miracle of modern science". From 1928 onwards, the German police used Korn's system to send photographs and fingerprints, though the use of the "phototelegraph" in apprehending a thief from a Stuttgart bank in London was recorded in 1907, as well as the use of the technology by the media, with the French paper l'Illustration contracting for a French monopoly that lasted until 1909.

He also worked on potential theory and the mathematics of physics. He was an Invited Speaker for the ICM in 1908 in Rome and in 1932 in Zürich.

== Works ==
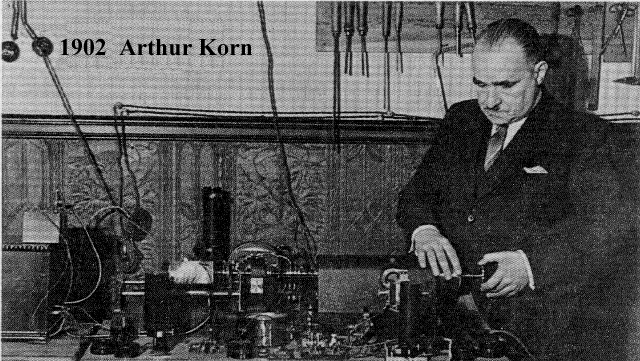
Korn was involved in the development of the fax machine, specifically the transmission of photographs or telephotography, known as the Bildetelegraph, related to early attempts at developing a practical mechanical television system.

- Eine Theorie der Gravitation und der elektrischen Erscheinungen auf Grundlage der Hydrodynamik (2nd ed., 1896)
- Ueber Molecular-Funktion (1897)
- Lehrbuch der Potentialtheorie (Berlin, 1899–1901)
- Freie und erzwungene Schwingungen (1910)
- Handbuch der Phototelegraphie (1911)
- Bildrundfunk with Eugen Nesper (1926)

He also contributed numerous articles to such journals as Berichte der Bayrischen Akademie der Wissenschaft, Comptes Rendus de l'Académie des Sciences, and Naturwissenschaftliches Wochenschrift.

== See also ==
- History of television
- Mechanical television
- Bain's facsimile
- German inventors and discoverers
- Granino A. Korn, son
- Theresa M. Korn, daughter-in-law and biographer of Arthur Korn
