= Shelford Bidwell =

English physicist and inventor

Shelford Bidwell FRS (6 March 1848 – 18 December 1909) was an English physicist and inventor. He is best known for his work with "telephotography", a precursor to the modern fax machine.

== Private life ==
He was born in Thetford, Norfolk the eldest son of Shelford Clarke Bidwell, a brewer, and his wife Georgina, the daughter of George Bidwell of Stanton, Norfolk. He entered Caius College, Cambridge, graduating BA (1870), MA (1873) and LLB (1873). Called to the bar from Lincoln's Inn in 1873, he practised as a barrister on the South Eastern Circuit for several years before becoming interested in electronics.

He married in 1874 Anna Wilhelmina Evelyn, daughter of Edward Firmstone, rector of Wyke (Regis), the mother church of Weymouth who lived much of later life with his family in Winchester to be close to Winchester Cathedral. Bidwell was the head of a wealthy Victorian family from 1881 to at least 1901, having five servants, at Riverstone, Wimbledon Park Road, Southfields, London. He died at his final family home in Weybridge, Surrey and was buried in one of the cemeteries of Walton-on-Thames.

== Research ==
In the late 1870s, he carried out a number of experiments with selenium photocells. In one experiment, he duplicated the "photophone" originally created by Alexander Graham Bell. This device used sound to vibrate a mirror. Variations in light intensity reflected from the vibrating mirror were detected using a selenium photocell which was then connected to a telephone. This showed that voice communication could be transmitted using light beams with a photocell used to convert it to an electrical signal. In another experiment, Bidwell placed a selenium photocell inside a rotating cylinder. A small hole in the cylinder allowed the photocell to scan an image on a brightly illuminated glass slide. Another rotating cylinder was covered with a paper treated with potassium iodide. The electrical signal from the photosignal was sent to a platinum wire that darkened the paper when current was applied. Bidwell's device did not solve the problem of synchronizing the transmitter and receiver. Both cylinders were on the same shaft. Similar devices for transmitting images had previously been demonstrated by Alexander Bain and Frederick Bakewell, but Bidwell was the first to use a photocell to scan the image. Bidwell reported his results in an article entitled "Tele-Photography" in the February 10, 1881 issue of Nature. His device is displayed in the London Science Museum. In 1886, he was elected a Fellow of the Royal Society. He was president of the Physical Society from 1897 to 1899.

In the June 4, 1908 issue of Nature, article "Telegraphic Photography and Electric Vision", Bidwell reported on "telegraphic photography" experiments by other scientists and commented on the greater difficulties faced by those wishing to develop "distant electric vision". He pointed out that besides the problem of synchronizing the transmitter and receiver, there was a much larger problem in transmitting the extremely large volume of data at a rate that would create a continuous image to be viewed. He estimated that each image would need to have 16,000 to 150,000 "elements" (pixels in modern terminology) and a minimum scan rate of 10 times per second would be required. He suggested that this high rate of data transmission would require a separate circuit for each line scanned or possibly a separate circuit for each point in the image. This large number of circuits would result in a large, complex and expensive device. This article illustrates some of the problems in creating television and the possible solutions that were being considered in the first decade of the 20th century. This article is also noteworthy because it prompted a response by Alan Archibald Campbell-Swinton, who suggested that the problems would be best solved by using cathode ray tubes instead of mechanical devices.

"Bidwell's ghost" is a visual phenomenon associated with after-images produced by alternating flashing lights.
