= Johann Michael Ekling =

Austrian inventor (1795–1876)

Johann Michael Ekling (also spelt Eckling) (8 August 1795, Vienna – 30 March 1876, Vienna) was an Austrian mechanic and inventor of scientific apparatuses and instruments.

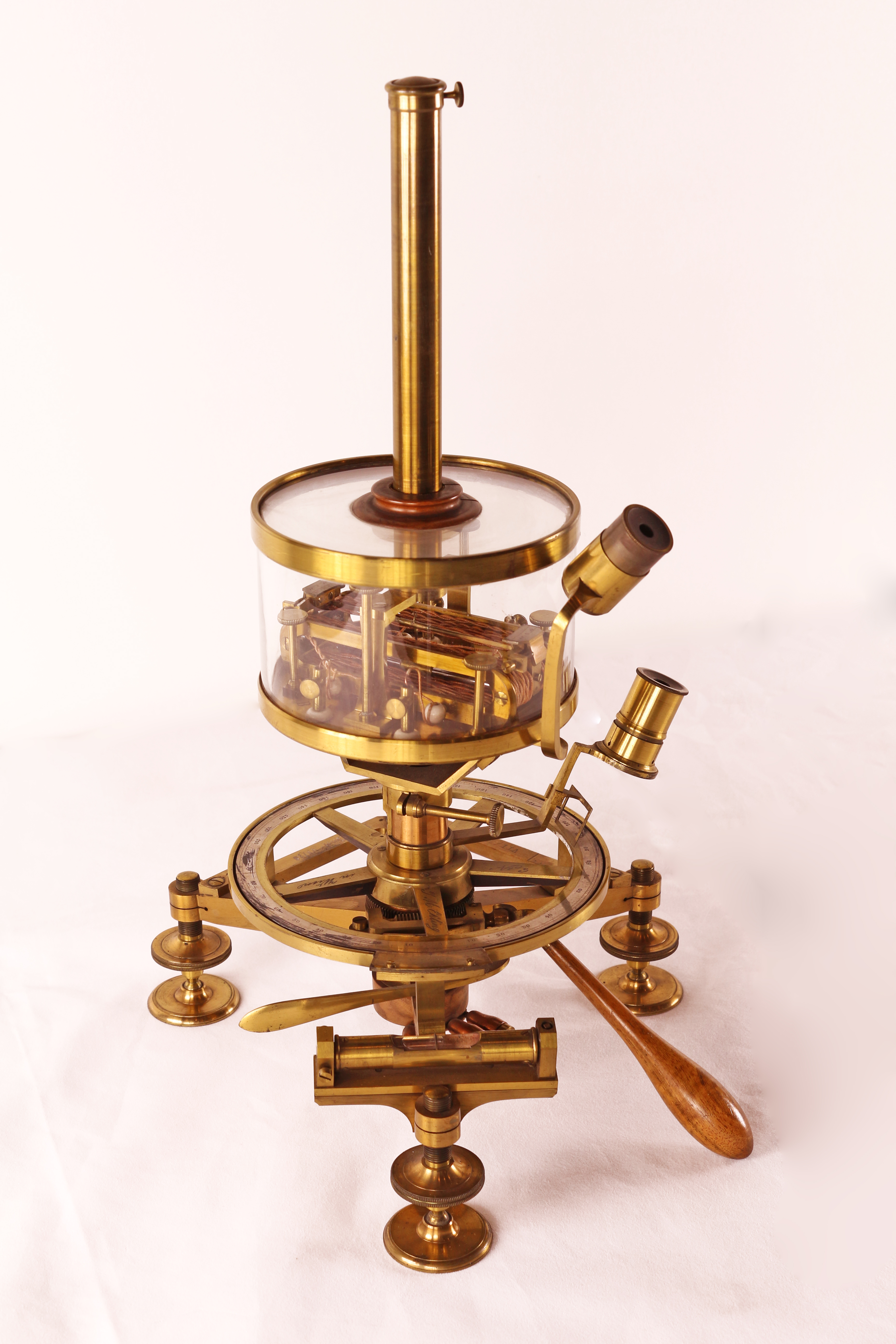
Nobili multiplier (galvanometer with a double needle) by Ekling (1834)

== Life ==
Johann Michael Ekling was the posthumous son of the army surgeon Joseph Ekling. His mother was Anna Maria Euphrosina Ekling née Spitzbarth. He was born in the suburb of Wieden (then a part of Vienna). At the age of 32 he married Theresia Schwarz, with whom he had five sons and a daughter. In the years to follow, he cooperated closely with mathematics and physics professors Andreas von Baumgartner (German Wikipedia) and Andreas von Ettingshausen of the University of Vienna. He produced artificial magnets on behalf of Baumgartner and one of the first photographic apparatuses in Austria (1839) following instructions by Ettingshausen, who had worked with Daguerre. By 1844 he is referred to as a "university mechanic". An announcement in a paper describes his range of products as follows: "[Ekling] makes all sorts of mathematical and physical instruments and apparatuses, air pumps with glass barrel chambers, travel barometers, goniometers, chemical and mineralogical apparatuses". His multiplicator was used for the analysis of mineral waters among other things and praised for its sensitivity. Ekling was granted patents for induction machines, cameras and improvements to the Bain telegraph, which were taken over by the Austrian railway. Ekling's last invention was a "Galvanic Induction Machine for Medical Purposes".

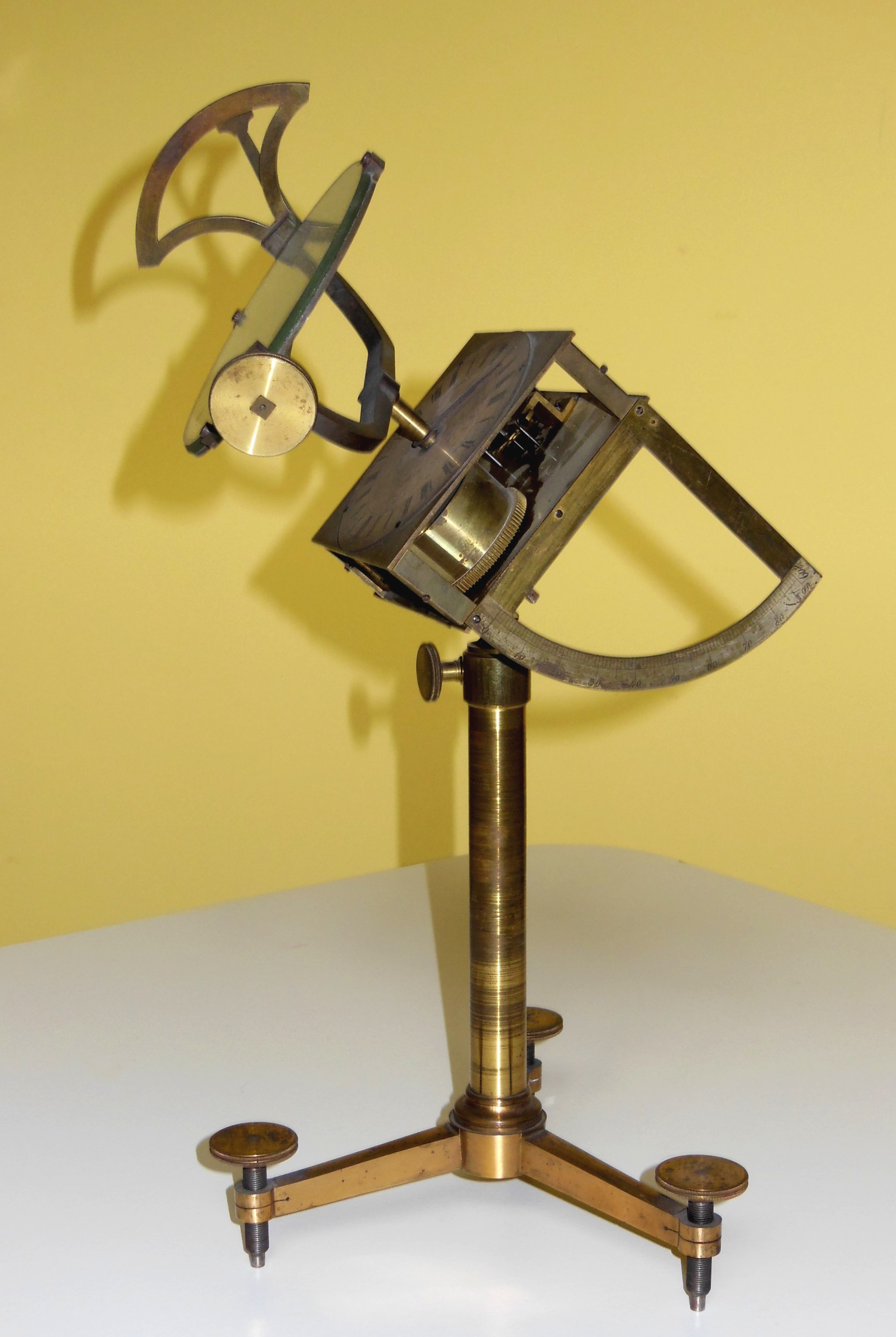
Heliostat by Ekling (ca. 1850)

His reputation as a mechanic is documented in the Austrian Law Gazette for 1850: "The most recommendable mechanic in Vienna, and as regards more sophisticated optical equipment, the only one to be recommended, is Eckling." Among these instruments, we find the heliostat in the picture alongside. Young mechanics from Germany like Rudolph Carl Adolph Dolberg (1817–1863) and Adolph Hermann Friedrich Petri (1819–1895) were apprenticed to Ekling. Johann Leopolder, who later ran his own large Telegraph and Telephone Company was also one of his apprentices and later his foreman, until he started his own establishment in 1850. In 1860 Ekling sold his premises at 25 Erdbergstraße to his neighbour Rudolf Ditmar who owned a rapidly expanding kerosine lamp factory. He died a gentleman of independent means in the suburb of Landstraße in Vienna in 1876.

== Literature ==
- Franz Pichler, Die Einführung der Morse-Telegraphie in Deutschland und Österreich. e&i elektrotechnik und informationstechnik, issue 9, 2006, p. 402–408
- Franz Pichler, Elektrisches Schreiben in die Ferne: die Telegraphie in Österreich: technische Entwicklung, 1846–1906., Linz 2007
- Baron Charles von Reichenbach, Physico-physiological Researches on the Dynamics of Magnetism, Electricity, Heat, Light, Chrystallization and Chemism, London 1850
