= David B. Adamson =

David Beveridge Adamson (1823 – 23 June 1891) was a farm implement manufacturer and inventor in Adelaide, South Australia.

== History ==
Adamson was born at Scaw Mill, Hawick, Roxburghshire, Scotland, one of seven children of wheelwright James Adamson (c. 1790 – 14 August 1864) and Elizabeth May Adamson, née Beveridge (17 September 1795 – 29 March 1870), who arrived in South Australia in September 1839 aboard Recovery from London. Their father founded a workshop and farm equipment factory on Hanson Street, Adelaide. Eventually the workshops, associated buildings and several houses occupied much of Town Acres 417 and 444 between Hanson Street and Bews Street. Their principal products were wheat harvesters and strippers based on John Ridley's patent, and with a reputation for trouble-free operation prospered, and became Adamson Brothers around 1855. They opened branches at Kapunda in 1859 Auburn in 1865 and Laura (where they had 30–40 employees) in 1874.

Adamson had attended school at Dunfermline, Scotland, but having an insatiable thirst for knowledge was largely self-educated. Around 1882 the brothers were able to retire from business, and Adamson was able to devote his inventive mind and energies to his passion for science and invention. Among his creations were:

- Various pieces of furniture
- A harmonium
- A violin, claimed in 1876 to have been (in 1841) the first made in the colony
- An orrery, built around 1870, later held by the Royal Astronomical Society of South Australia
- A Foucault gyroscope
- A Gregorian telescope, and induced his good friend A. W. Dobbie to build one
- A Newtonian telescope

. . . and any number of gadgets, toys and scientific curiosities.

He was in 1867 elected a fellow of the Philosophical Society Royal Society of South Australia in 1867 and a member of its council from 1879. He published three papers in that society's Transactions and Proceedings.

He was one of the most ingenious men whom I ever met. The telescope which forms so prominent a feature in the arrangements of his house in Wakefield-street (Note: Probably a lapse of memory here; Adamson lived at "Stanley House" on Angas Street) is really one of the most remarkable specimens of the outcome of patience and genius which Adelaide contains.

He used the telescope to good effect during the partial eclipse of the Sun on 12 December 1890. He experimented for a few days prior to the event to get the clearest picture without frying the emulsion on the glass slide, and found he got excellent results by reducing the aperture of the telescope considerably and removing the silver coating from the speculum (curved mirror) so only a small percentage of the sun's rays was reflected from the glass surface.

== Other interests ==
He was, as were his brothers, a strong supporter of the Church, a founding member of Chalmers Church and Stow Memorial Church of which he was a deacon and Sunday-school superintendent.

He was a prominent supporter of the Young Men's Christian Association, the Chamber of Manufactures and the Destitute Board.

== Last days and death ==
In his last years, Adamson suffered from asthma, for which he was treated by Dr Way, and died following a stroke or from rheumatic heart disease. His remains were buried at the West Terrace Cemetery.

It was well that Mr Adamson died as he did—quietly and peacefully without protracted illness. Had he lived after the seizure to which he succumbed he would have been a chronic invalid, and that would have seemed intolerable even to a philosopher like him

== Family ==
Adamson married Emma Golding La Vence (c. 1831–1880) on 6 November 1849 at Tenterden Cottage, Adelaide. Their fifteen children include:

- James Beveridge Adamson (6 August 1851 – 23 December 1918) married (1) Barbara Anderson (1850–1879) on 5 December 1872 and (2) Mary Ann Ames (1855–1938) on 6 August 1880
- Sarah Kidd Adamson (11 January 1854 – 2 January 1924)
- Elizabeth Beveridge Adamson (4 June 1855 – 19 October 1919) married Cornelius Edward Hall (1849–1917) on 23 September 1875
- Emma Adamson (11 May 1857 – 22 February 1931) married Henry Savage (1858–1934) on 18 May 1881
- Magdalene Adamson (4 June 1859 – 19 November 1931) married Thomas James Ames Ames (1858–1928) on 5 July 1883
- David Beveridge Adamson (5 August 1862 – 13 December 1937) married Eliza Gertrude Greenwood (1863–1948) on 18 October 1883, died in Perth, Western Australia
- Robert Beveridge Adamson (31 October 1864 – 28 July 1939) married Emma "Emmie" Stanford (1863–1931) on 1 November 1892; died in Temora, New South Wales. He was a noted photographer.
- Charles Francis Adamson (19 October 1866 – 26 September 1938) married Mary Dorothea Sarah Ellen Krischock (1868–1942) on 30 November 1897
- William Steele Adamson (26 February 1868 – 11 December 1932) married Elizabeth Caroline Sabine (1870–1959) on 28 January 1902 died in Parkside, South Australia
- Lilian Adamson (13 October 1870 – 18 June 1943) married William Penry Jones (c. 1853–1939) on 28 August 1895
- Albert Stanley Adamson (26 August 1872 – 26 June 1939) married Emily Edith Arbon (1869–1952) on 26 August 1898
- Margaret Thomson Adamson (20 December 1873 – 5 August 1937) married Percival Harold Price (1879–1958) on 29 October 1901
- Florence May Adamson (22 June 1876 – 8 April 1949) married Richard Alexander Duncan (1871–1954) on 7 December 1899

He married again, on 7 December 1882 to Mary Humphris (1856–1913). They had no further children.

See also James Hazel Adamson for more on his brothers.
