= Alexander Bain (inventor) =

Scottish inventor and engineer

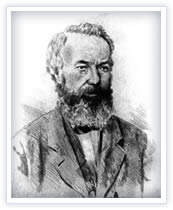
- Born: 12 October 1810; Watten, Caithness, Scotland
- Died: 2 January 1877 (aged 66); Broomhill, Kirkintilloch, Scotland
- Resting place: Auld Aisle Cemetery, Kirkintilloch, Scotland
- Occupations: instrument inventor, technician, and clockmaker

Alexander Bain (12 October 1810 – 2 January 1877) was a Scottish inventor and engineer who was first to invent and patent the electric clock. He created the first fax machine, known as Bain's facsimile. Bain also installed the railway telegraph lines between Edinburgh and Glasgow.

== Early life ==
Bain was born in Leanmore, near Watten, Caithness, Scotland. He was baptised in the local kirk on 22 November 1810. His father was a crofter. He had a twin sister, Margaret, and, in total, he had six sisters and six brothers. Bain did not excel in school and was apprenticed to a clockmaker in Wick.

== Career ==
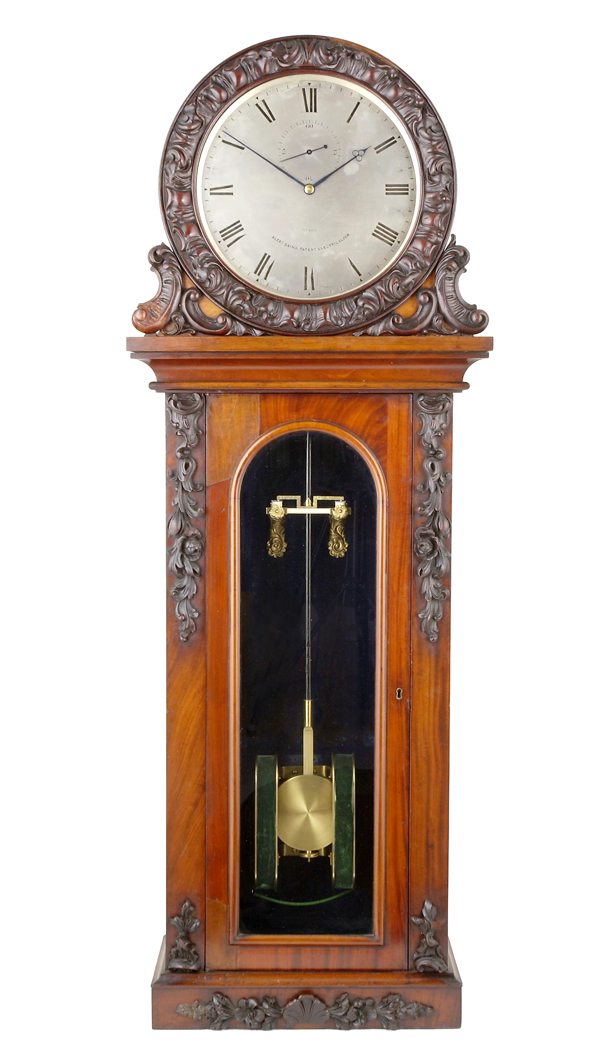
Electric clock, Alexander Bain, London, ca. 1845 (Deutsches Uhrenmuseum, Inv. 2004-162)

Having learned the art of clockmaking, he went to Edinburgh, and in 1837 to London, where he obtained work as a journeyman in Clerkenwell. Bain frequented the lectures at the Polytechnic Institution and the Adelaide Gallery and later constructed his own workshop in Hanover Street.

=== Electric clocks and Railway Telegraphs ===
In 1840, desperate for money to develop his inventions, Bain mentioned his financial problems to the editor of the Mechanics Magazine, who introduced him to Sir Charles Wheatstone. Bain demonstrated his models to Wheatstone, who, when asked for his opinion, said "Oh, I shouldn't bother to develop these things any further! There's no future in them." Three months later Wheatstone demonstrated an electric clock to the Royal Society, claiming it was his own invention. However, Bain had already applied for a patent for it. Wheatstone tried to block Bain's patents, but failed. When Wheatstone organised an Act of Parliament to set up the Electric Telegraph Company, the House of Lords summoned Bain to give evidence, and eventually compelled the company to pay Bain £10,000 and give him a job as manager, causing Wheatstone to resign.

Bain's first patent was dated 11 January 1841, and was in the names of John Barwise, chronometer maker, and Alexander Bain, mechanist. It describes his electric clock which uses a pendulum kept moving by electromagnetic impulses. He improved on this in later patents, including a proposal to derive the required electricity from an "earth battery", which consisted of plates of zinc and copper buried in the ground.

In December 1841, Bain in conjunction with Lieutenant Thomas Wright RN, patented a method for using electricity to control railway engines by turning off steam, marking time, giving signals, and printing information at different locations. The most significant idea incorporated in the patent was his plan for inverting the needle telegraph earlier developed by Ampère, Wheatstone and others: instead of making signals by a pivoted magnetic needle under the influence of an electromagnet, he made them by suspending a movable coil between the poles of a fixed magnet. A similar concept appears in Sir William Thomson's siphon recorder. Bain also proposed to make the coil record messages by printing them, an idea he developed further in a subsequent patent. Bain's telegraph was first used in December 1845 on the Edinburgh and Glasgow Railway which had opened in 1842. In January 1846 he convinced the directors of the Stockton and Darlington Railway to install his telegraph between the north and south ends of their Shildon Tunnel. These instruments remained in use until September 1865 (and still survive, see below). His telegraph was also successful abroad: "The initial Austrian Bain instruments were made by Johann Michael Ekling in Vienna, and later by the k.k. Telegraphenwerkstätte Wien, the Imperial Royal Telegraph Workshops Vienna."

"For many years I have devoted myself to rendering electricity practically useful, and have been extensively engaged, not only in this country, but in America and on the Continent, in the construction and working of the Electric Telegraph; while at the same time, the employment of electricity in the measurement of time has also engaged my attention."

Alexander Bain, A Short History of the Electric Clocks

==== Surviving examples ====
Bain's extant electric clocks come from two stages of development between the 1840s and the 1860s. Examples can be seen in Watten's Village Hall, the National Museum of Scotland, the National Maritime Museum of London, the London Science Museum and the Deutsches Uhrenmuseum. The most rare and interesting mantel clocks are in private hands. One featured in the "Electrifying Time" exhibition in 1977 at the London Science Museum. Bain sometimes found complex and ornate solutions to relatively simple, although not easy to solve problems. The most complex, his mantel clock, worked on an electro-magnetic pull push, pull push for each complete period of swing employing a pendulum with opposing magnetic fields. At a very similar time, Matthäus Hipp constructed a more simple and reliable system which used a simple toggle switch to impulse the pendulum every so often.

One of Bain's telegraph instruments is on display at the National Museum of Scotland, probably from the Edinburgh and Glasgow Railway. The two instruments used by the Stockton and Darlington Railway at Shildon tunnel are in the National Railway Museum collection. One of Bain's printing telegraphs from 1843 is in the collection of the Museum für Kommunikation Frankfurt. The Shildon instruments were also provided with single-stroke bells, the hammers of which were held up by 'trip gear' which was released by the first electrical pulse to deflect the needle; upon completion of the message exchange the hammer then had to be raised again by hand. If the operator failed to hear the single ring, there was no method of repeating it – only the movement of the needle could be observed.

=== Facsimile machine ===
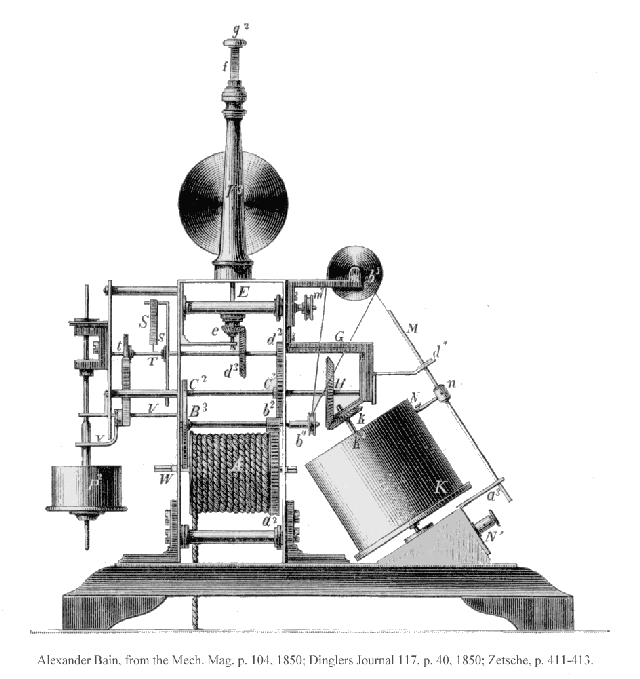
Bain's improved facsimile 1850

Bain worked on an experimental fax machine from 1843 to 1846. He used a clock to synchronise the movement of two pendulums for line-by-line scanning of a message. For transmission, Bain applied metal pins arranged on a cylinder made of insulating material. An electric probe that transmitted on-off pulses then scanned the pins. The message was reproduced at the receiving station on electrochemically sensitive paper impregnated with a chemical solution similar to that developed for Bain's chemical telegraph. In his patent description dated 27 May 1843 for "improvements in producing and regulating electric currents and improvements in timepieces, and in electric printing, and signal telegraphs," he claimed that "a copy of any other surface composed of conducting and non-conducting materials can be taken by these means". The transmitter and receiver were connected by five wires. In 1850 he applied for an improved version but was too late, as Frederick Bakewell had obtained a patent for his superior "image telegraph" two years earlier in 1848.

Bain's and Bakewell's laboratory mechanisms reproduced poor quality images and were not viable systems because the transmitter and receiver were never truly synchronized. In 1861, the first practical operating electro-mechanical commercially exploited telefax machine, the Pantelegraph, was invented by the Italian physicist Giovanni Caselli. He introduced the first commercial telefax service between Paris and Lyon at least 11 years before the invention of workable telephones.

In 1881, English inventor Shelford Bidwell constructed the scanning phototelegraph that was the first telefax machine capable to scan any two-dimensional original, without requiring manual plotting or drawing. Around 1900, German physicist Arthur Korn invented the "Bildtelegraph" widespread in continental Europe especially since a widely noticed transmission of a wanted-person photograph from Paris to London in 1908 used until the wider distribution of the radiofax. Its main competitors were the Bélinographe by Édouard Belin first, then since the 1930s, the Hellschreiber, invented in 1929 by German inventor Rudolf Hell, a pioneer in mechanical image scanning and transmission.

=== Chemical telegraph ===
On 12 December 1846, Bain, who was then living in Edinburgh, patented a chemical telegraph. He had seen that the Morse and other telegraphs then in use were comparatively slow, due to the mechanical inertia of their moving parts, and realized that the signal current could be used to make a readable mark on a moving paper tape soaked in a mixture of ammonium nitrate and potassium ferrocyanide, which gave a blue mark when a current was passed through it.

The speed at which marks could be made on the paper was so high that hand signalling could not keep up with it, and so Bain devised a method of automatic signalling using punched paper tape. The concept was later used by Wheatstone in his automatic sender. Bain's chemical telegraph was tried between Paris and Lille, and attained a speed of 282 words in 52 seconds, a great advance on Morse's telegraph which could only give about 40 words per minute.

In England Bain's telegraph was used on the wires of the Electric Telegraph Company to a limited extent, and in 1850 it was used in America by Henry O'Reilly. However, it incurred the hostility of Samuel Morse, who obtained an injunction against it on the grounds that the paper tape and alphabet used fell under his patent. Consequently, by 1859 Bain's telegraph was in use on only one line and never really entered general usage.

== Later life ==
Initially Bain made a considerable sum from his inventions but lost his wealth in poor investments. In 1873, Sir William Thomson, Sir William Siemens, Latimer Clark and others obtained a Civil List pension for Bain from Prime Minister William Ewart Gladstone of £80 per year.

== Death and legacy ==
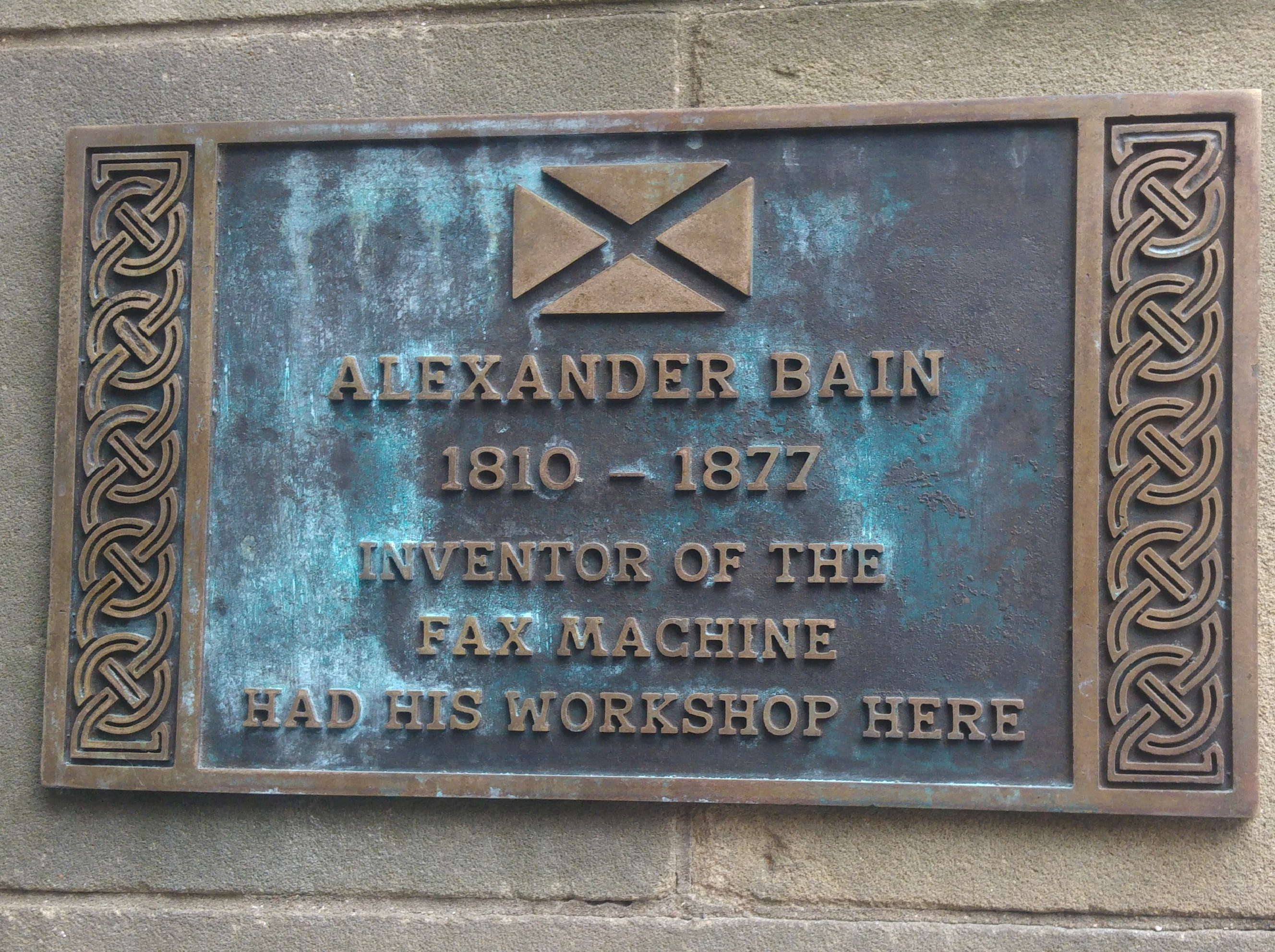
A commemorative plaque to Bain at his former workshop on Hanover Street in Edinburgh.

Bain was buried in the Auld Aisle Cemetery, Kirkintilloch. It was restored in 1959. The headstone initially had an incorrect year of death (1876) which was later corrected to 1877. JD Wetherspoons pub in Wick, close to where Alexander Bain served his apprenticeship, is now named 'The Alexander Bain' after the inventor. Also, as a tribute to his inventions, the main BT building in Glasgow is named Alexander Bain House. One of the earliest examples of an electrically impulsed pendulum clock is on display at the Deutsches Uhrenmuseum.

In 2016, he was posthumously awarded the Technology & Engineering Emmy Award "for his pioneering work in the transmission of images". The statuette is on display in Kirkintilloch Town Hall.

== Sources ==
- Books, Om (2017). 101 Inventions that changed the World. New York, New York: Om Books International. ISBN 9789386316103.
- Briggs (1896). The Electrical Engineer. London, England: Briggs and Company.
- Campbell, Valerie (2011). The Caithness Influence. London, England: Whittles Publishing Limited. ISBN 9781849950398.
- Desmond, Kevin (2016). Innovators in Battery Technology. New York, New York: McFarland, Incorporated, Publishers. ISBN 9781476622781.
- Finley, Samuel (1849). Report of the Case of Alexander Bain, Appellant, Vs Samuel F.B. Morse, Respondent. Washuington, D.C.: Gideon & Company printers. OCLC 635974128.
- Lamont, Steward (2001). When Scotland Ruled the World. London, England: Harper Collins. ISBN 9780007100019.
- Mackay, A N (2016). A History of North Eastern Railway Signalling. North Eastern Railway Association. ISBN 9781873513996.
- McNeil, Ian (2002). Biographical Dictionary History of Technology. Chicago, Illinois: Taylor & Francis. ISBN 9781134650200.
- Mudie, Robert (1841). Surveyor, Engineer, and Architect, Volume 2. London, England: Grattan & Gilbert. OCLC 1079304407.
- Munro, John (1891). "Alexander Bain". Heroes of the telegraph. London: Religious Tract Society. pp. 277–280.
- Polhemus, John (1876). The Leading Telegraph Patents, Including Original and Reissued Patents of S. F. B. Morse. New York, New York: John Polhemus. OCLC 58894234.
- Shaffner, Taliaferro Preston (1859). The Telegraph Manual. New York, New York: TPudney & Russell. OCLC 809109104.
- Wheen, Andrew (2011). Dot-Dash to Dot.Com. New York, New York: Springer. ISBN 9781441967602.
- Winston, Robert (2010). Bad Ideas?: An arresting history of our inventions. New York, New York: Transworld. ISBN 9781409094401.

== Patents ==
- U.S. patent 006,837
