= Paul-Gustave Froment =

French inventor

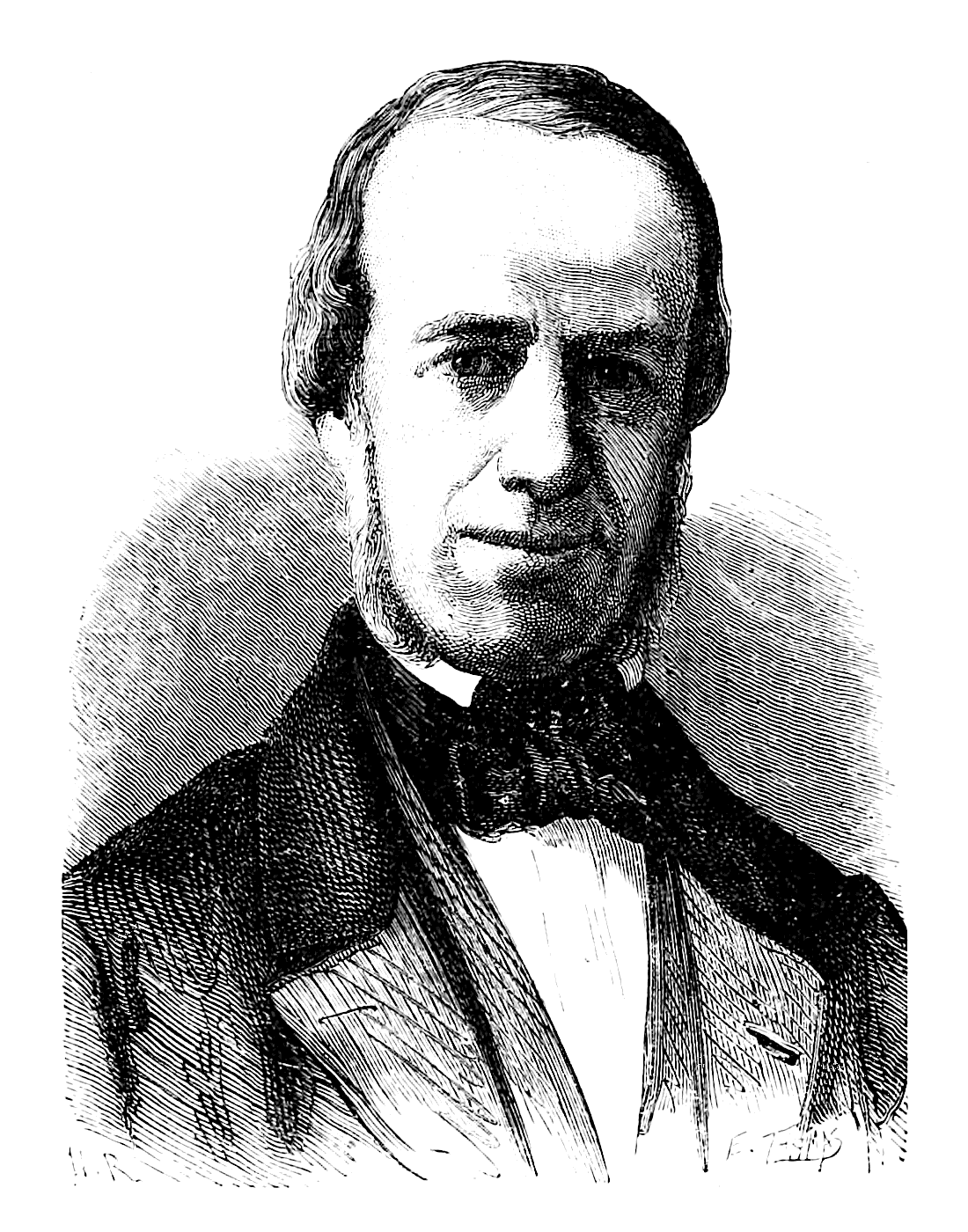
Paul-Gustave Froment

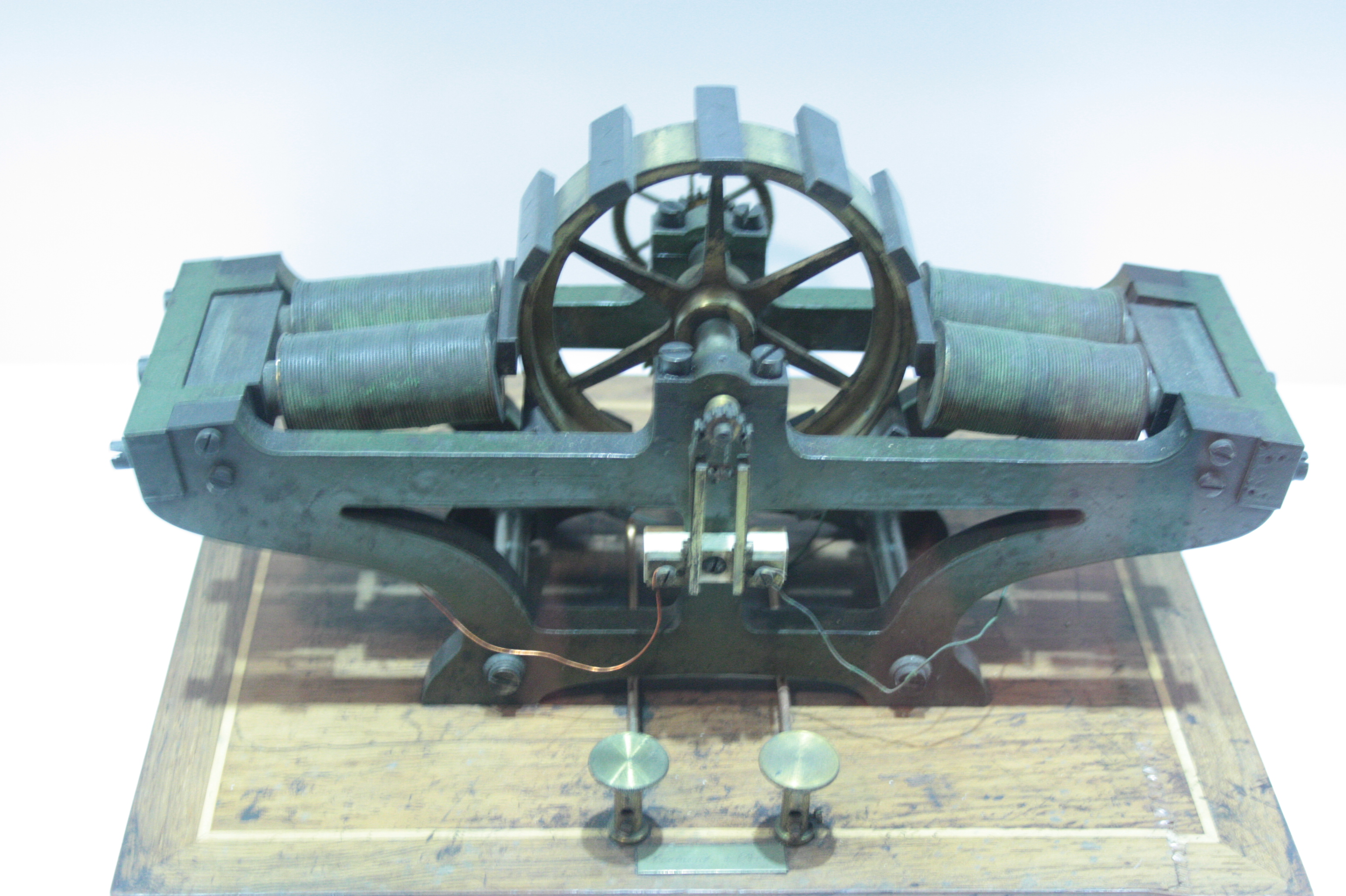
Froment's Mouse mill motor, 1849, Hunterian Museum, Glasgow

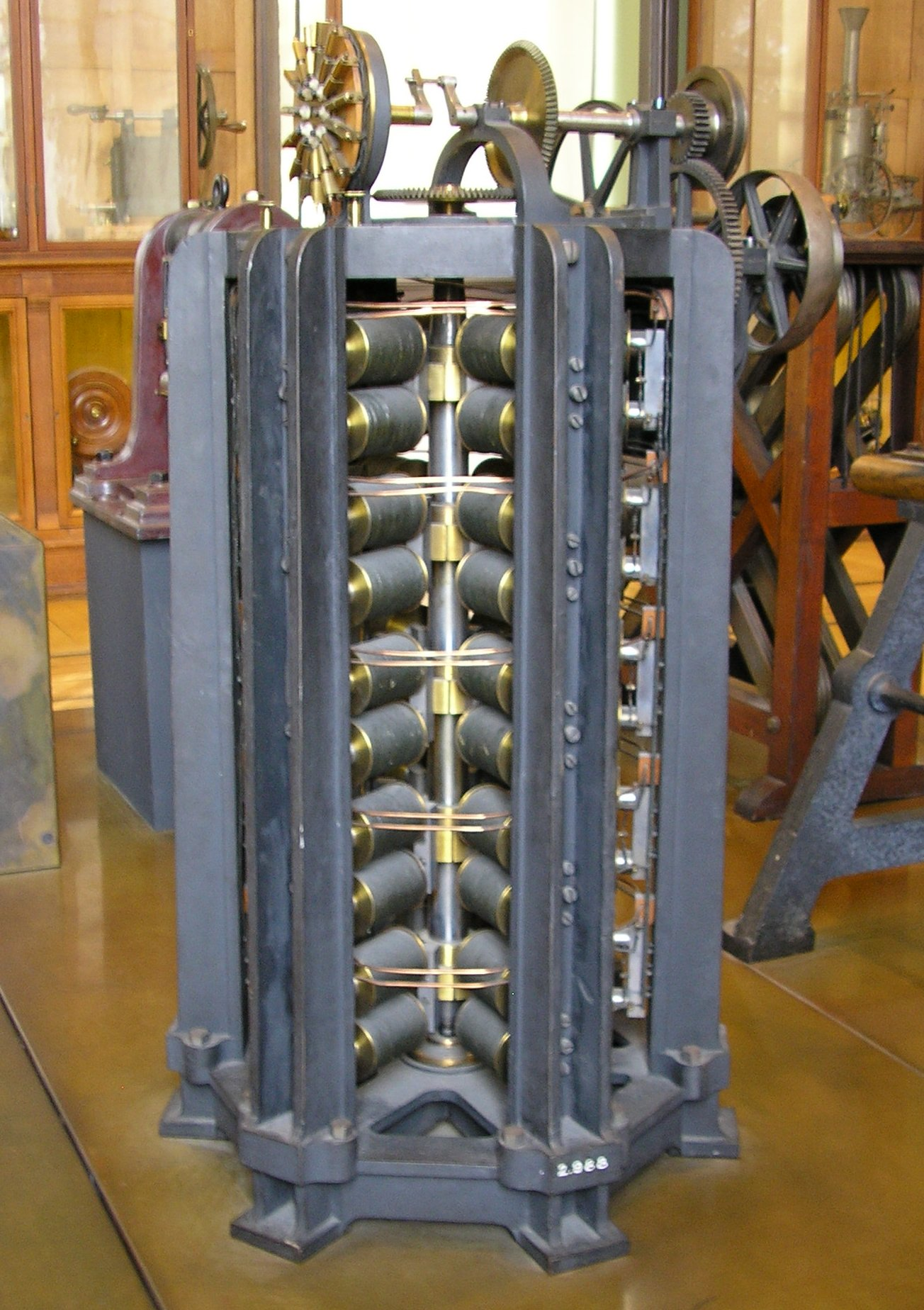
Froment's electric motor, 1844

Paul-Gustave Froment (born 3 March 1815 in Paris; died 1865) was a French mechanic, instrument maker and inventor.

== Life ==
He was born in Paris and was educated at the Collège Sainte-Barbe and the Lycée Louis-le-Grand. Having demonstrated from childhood talent for technology, his father decided to let him study at the Ecole Polytechnique in Paris. He later moved to Britain to continue his studies in Manchester.

He was also one of the earliest photographers, working with the Direct Positive Process.

On his return to France, his intention was to build steam engines but he was prevented from doing so by lack of funds. Instead, he opened a Paris workshop in 1844 where, among other things, he worked on a telegraph with written and keyboard signals, improved Gaetan Bonelli's electric loom, and helped William Hughes improve his early typewriter.

He worked on several projects with Léon Foucault, most famously the Foucault pendulum for Foucault's 1851 demonstration. Other projects with Foucault included the gyroscope, and the rotating mirror used by Foucault to measure the relative speed of light in air and water.

In 1854 he built a simpler and improved version of Charles Shepherd's electromechanical clock.

He is best known for designing early electric motors for industrial use, for which he was awarded the valuable Volta Prize in 1857. In his design electromagnets were energized to attract iron rods attached to a rotating flywheel. At the moment that an iron rod reached the electromagnet, the power to the solenoid was interrupted until the next iron rod approached the electromagnet.

On his death in 1865 he was buried in the Père-Lachaise cemetery in Paris.
