= Foucault's gyroscope =

Experiment in 1852 to demonstrate the Earth's rotation

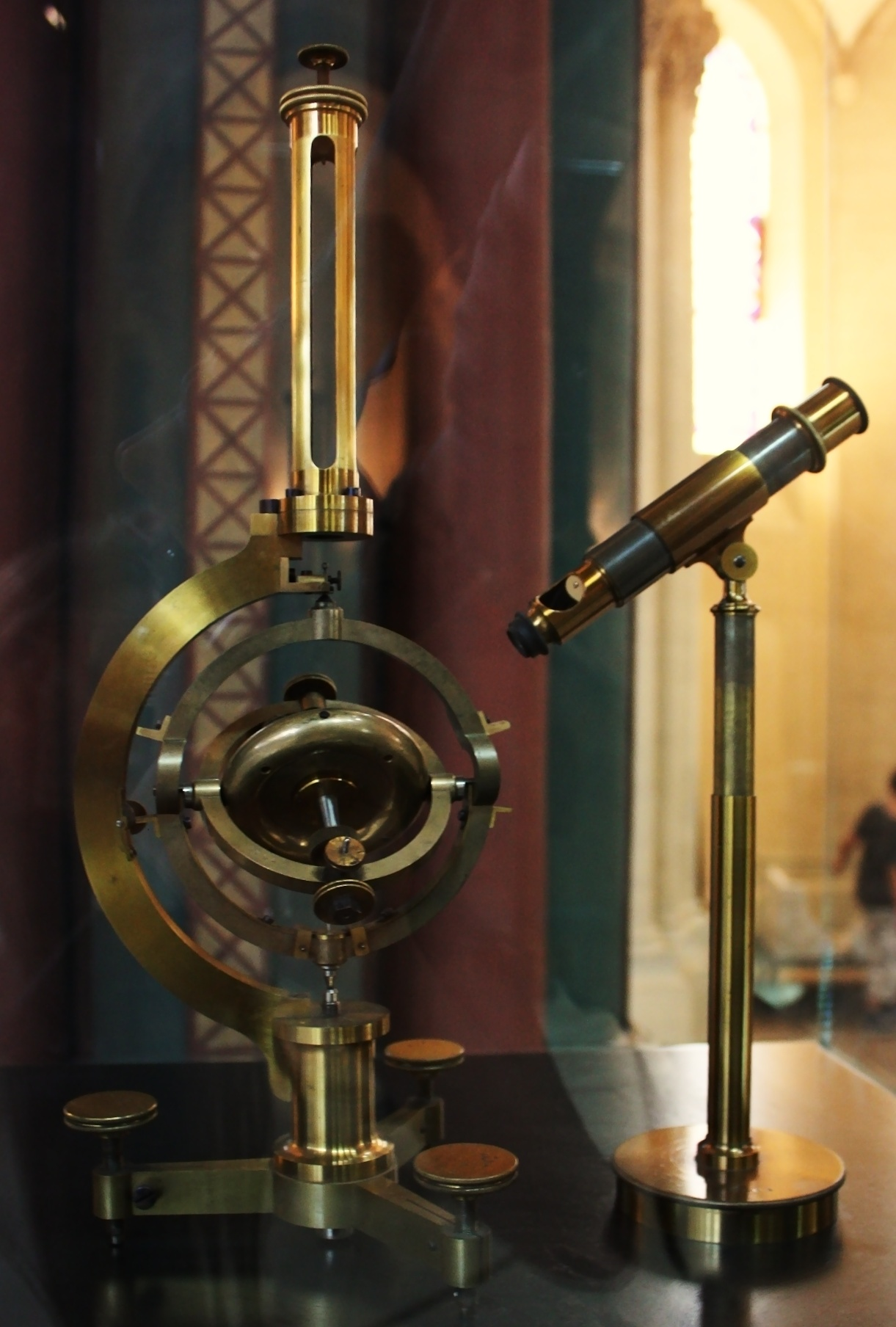
Gyroscope designed by Léon Foucault in 1852. Replica built by Dumoulin-Froment for the 1867 Exposition Universelle. National Conservatory of Arts and Crafts museum, Paris.

The Foucault gyroscope was a gyroscope created by French physicist Léon Foucault in 1852, conceived as a follow-up experiment to his pendulum in order to further demonstrate the Earth's rotation.

Foucault felt that the results of his famous pendulum experiment had been misunderstood. He therefore endeavored to create an apparatus with a "body freely suspended by its center of gravity and rotating around one of its principal axes", allowing the study of a plane with "absolute directional stability". The mechanical precision of Foucault's gyroscope allowed this to be proven clearly to the scientific establishment, and the gyroscope became a widely popular instrument.

== Design ==
Together with Paul-Gustave Froment, Foucault built an apparatus in which the inner gimbal was balanced on knife edge bearings on the outer gimbal and the outer gimbal was suspended by a fine, torsion-free thread in such a manner that the lower pivot point carried almost no weight.

The gyro was spun to 9,000–12,000 revolutions per minute with an arrangement of gears before being placed into position, which was sufficient time to balance the gyroscope and carry out 10 minutes of experimentation. The instrument could be observed either with a microscope viewing a tenth of a degree scale or by a long pointer.

== Publications ==
Foucault published two papers in 1852, one focused on astronomy with the weight free to move on all three axes (On a new experimental demonstration of the motion of the Earth, based on the fixity of the plane of rotation) and the other on mechanics with the weight free to move on only two axes (On the orientation phenomena of rotating bodies driven by a fixed axis on the Earth's surface. New sensitive signs of daily movement).

In the paper on mechanics, Foucault explained that if one axis of rotation is fixed in line with the surface of the Earth, the other two axes of rotation tend to the same direction, similar to "a magnetic needle", making it possible to use the instrument to highlight a directing force.

== Naming ==
Foucault coined the name gyroscope in the 1852 publication of his experiment:

This apparatus specially designed to highlight and approximate the deviation of a freely rotating body can also be used to produce and observe the phenomena of orientation that I have just stated and described. As all these phenomena depend on the movement of the Earth and are its varied manifestations, I propose to name the sole instrument which has served me to observe them gyroscope.

== Copies ==
At least three more copies of a Foucault's gyroscope were made in convenient travelling and demonstration boxes, and copies survive in the UK, France, and the US. The original was given to the Collège de France and was lost. There are no known photographs of the original, suggesting it was lost a few decades after the College received it.

The Foucault gyroscope became a challenge and source of inspiration for skilled science hobbyists such as David B. Adamson.

== Gallery ==
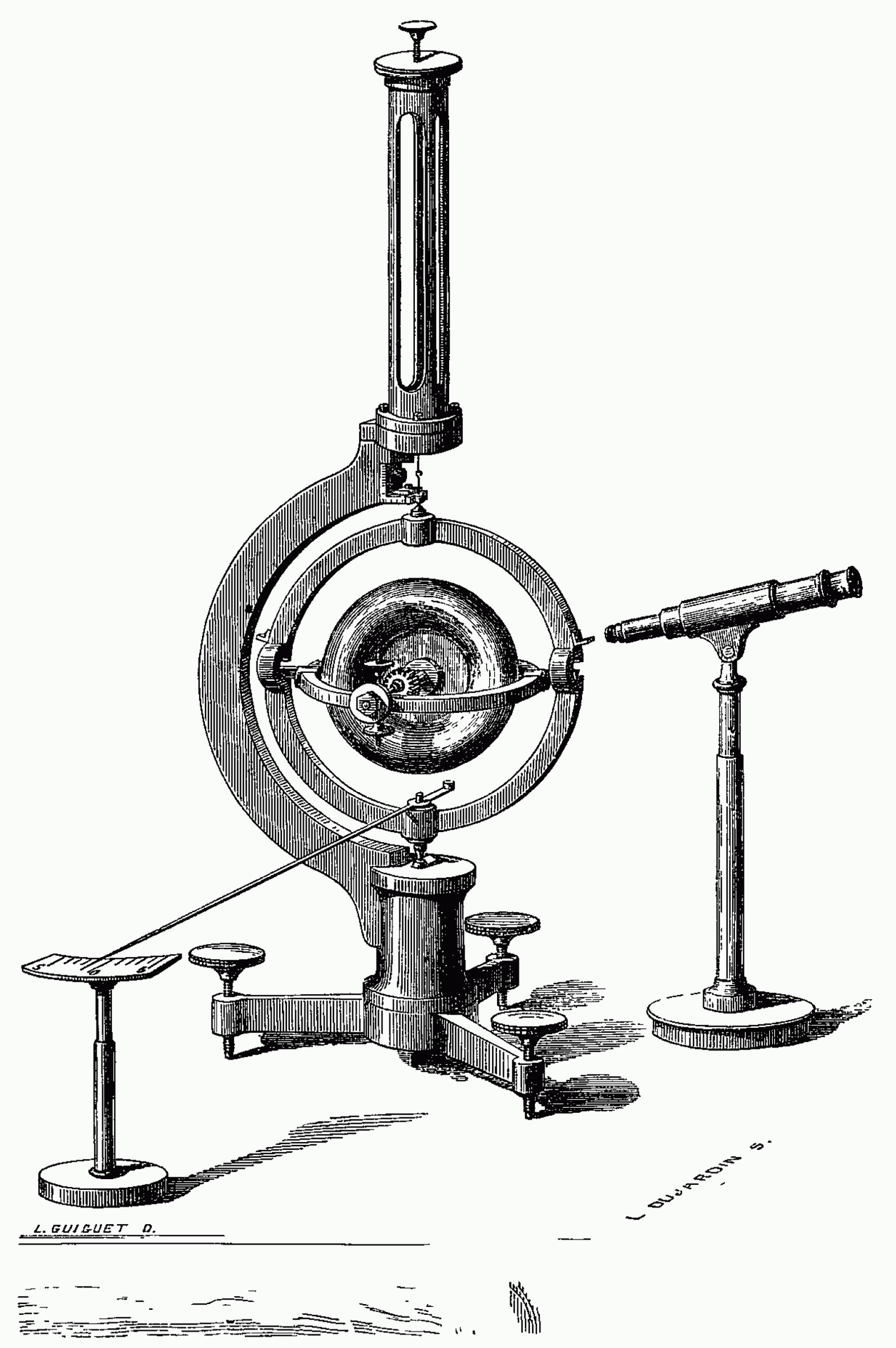
Sketch of the gyroscope

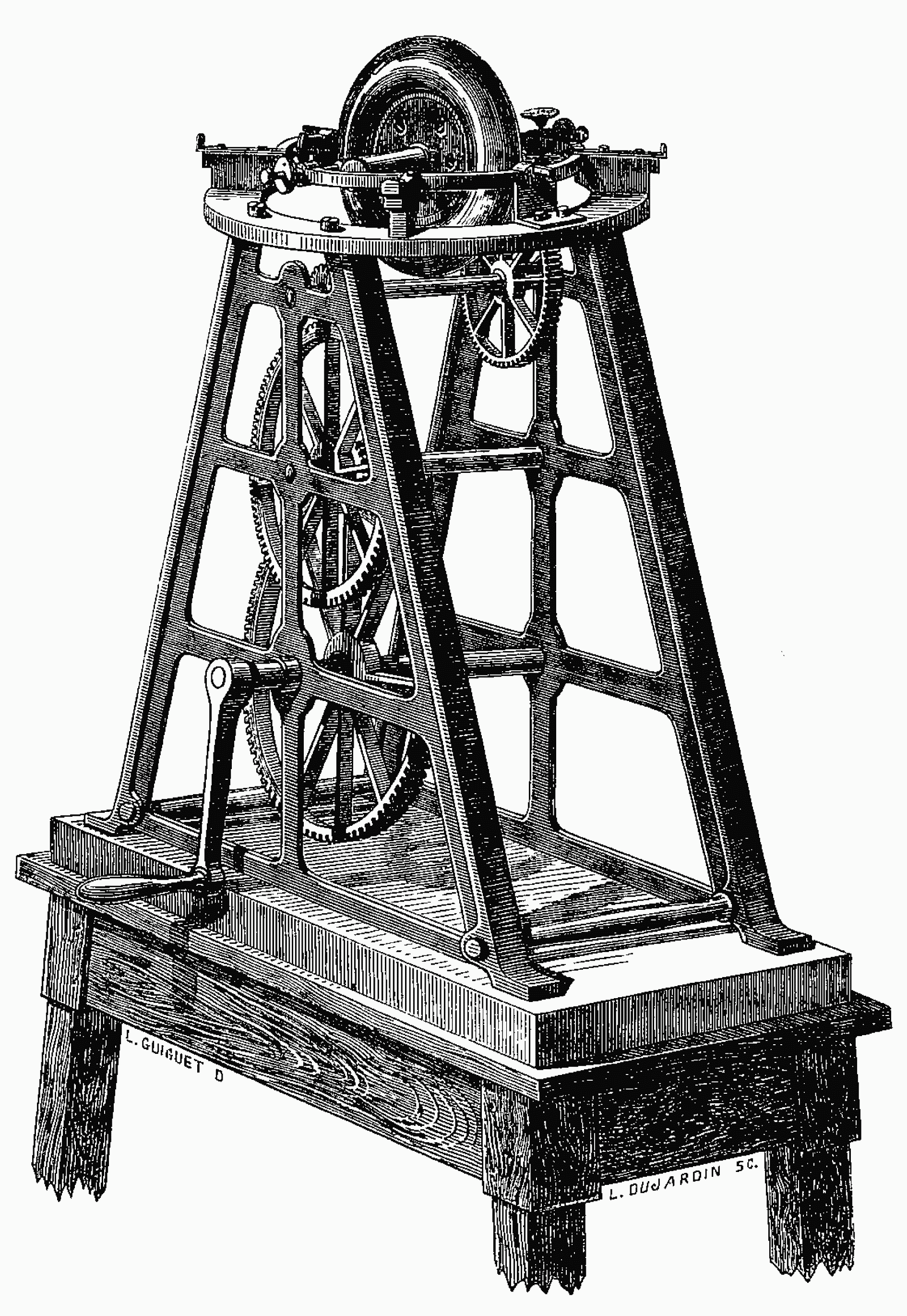
Launching device for the gyroscope

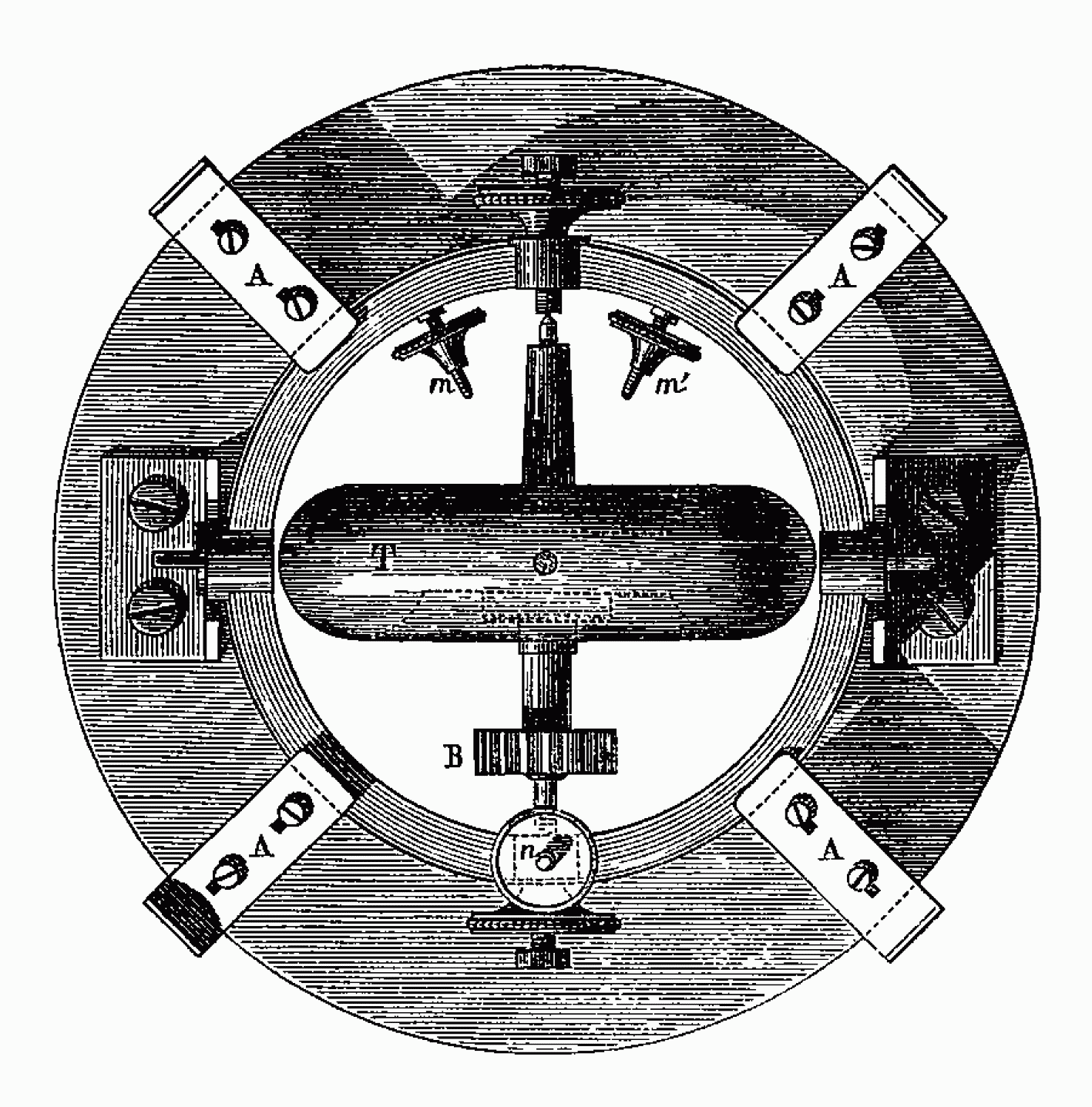

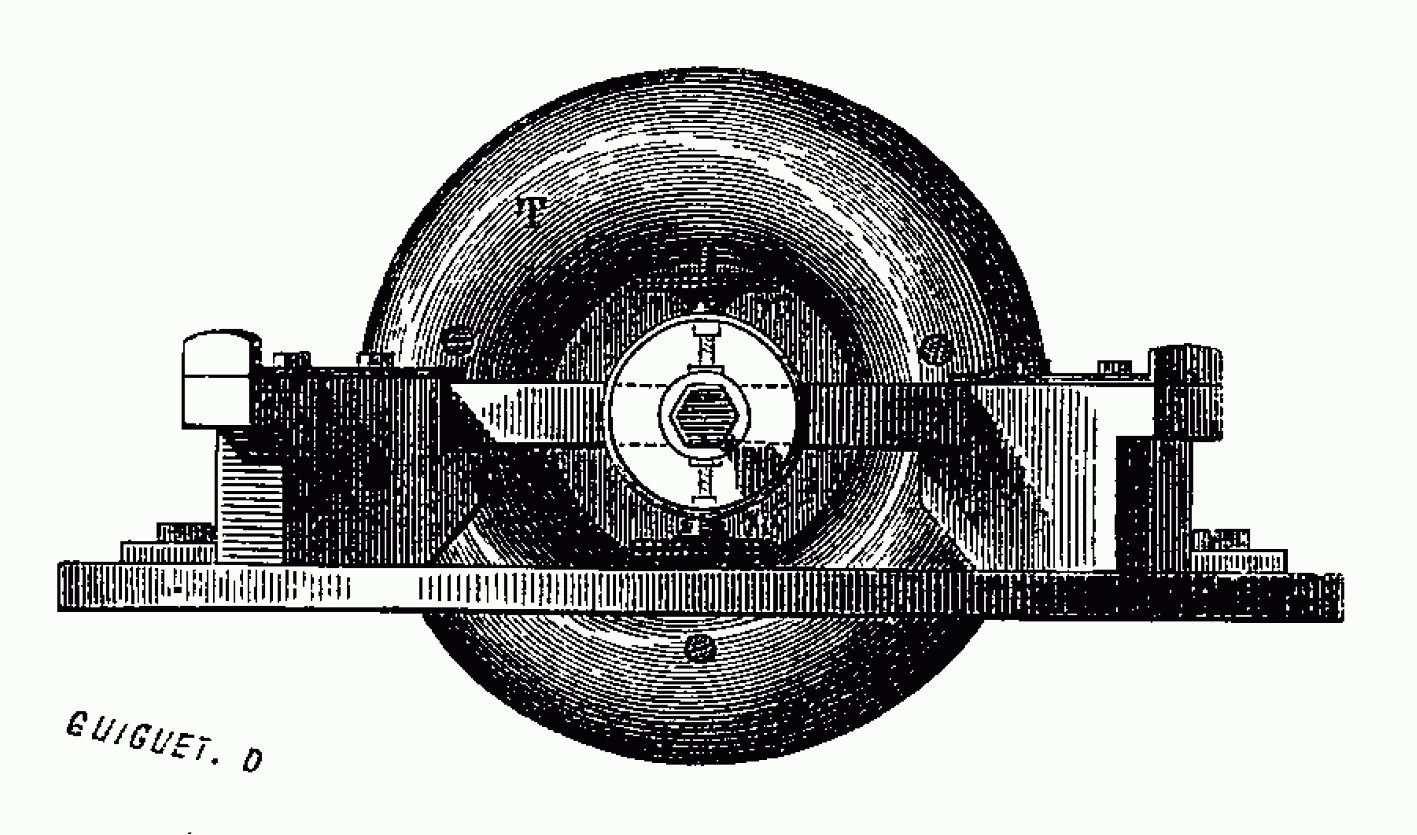

== Citations ==
- Foucault, Léon (1852a). "Astronomie: Sur une nouvelle démonstration expérimentale du mouvement de la Terre, fondée sur la fixité du plan de rotation". Comptes rendus hebdomadaires des séances de l'Académie des Sciences (in French). 35 (Week of Monday 27 September 1852). Gauthier-Villars: 421-424.
- Foucault, Léon (1852b). "Mécanique: Sur les phénomènes d'orientation des corps tournants entraînés par un axe fixe à la surface de la Terre. Nouveaux signes sensibles du mouvement diurne". Comptes rendus hebdomadaires des séances de l'Académie des Sciences (in French). 35 (Week of Monday 27 September 1852). Gauthier-Villars: 424-427.
