= Eugen Nesper =

German electrical engineer (1879–1961)

Eugen Heinrich Josef Nesper (5 July 1879 – 3 May 1961) was a German radio pioneer and high-frequency technician.

== Life ==
Eugen Nesper was born in Meiningen, and studied electrical engineering and economics until 1902 at the Technische Hochschule (technical high-school) in Charlottenburg. He experimented in wireless telegraphy in 1897 in Potsdam-Babelsberg, under the supervision of Professor Adolf Slaby (1849–1913) and his assistant Georg Graf von Arco (1869–1940). Therefore, he was among the pioneers in radio broadcasting.

After three years as an assistant, Nesper received his doctorate at the University of Rostock. He worked at Telefunken and later at C. Lorenz AG. He supported the introduction of broadcasting, especially in 1923. At that time he also presented a remarkable radio with seven tubes. He died in Berlin in 1961.

== Publications ==
Nesper gained fame with a number of publications on the radio technology, both in scientific journals such as Der Radio-Amateur and Elektrotechnische Zeitschrift, as well as with numerous books of his own, including the standard work Wege zum Detektorlautsprecher (Methods of the Detector-Loudspeaker), which appeared in 1946 and was revised substantially in 1949.

Other works include:

- Die drahtlose Telegraphie und ihr Einfluss auf den Wirtschaftsverkehr unter besonderer Berücksichtigung des "System Telefunken" (Wireless telegraphy and its impact on economic transactions with particular reference to the "Telefunken System"), Berlin (Springer), 1905
- Handbuch der drahtlosen Telegraphie und Telephonie (Handbook of wireless telegraphy and telephony), Berlin (Springer) 1921, two volumes
- Radio-Schnell-Telegraphie (Fast radio telegraphy), 1922
- Der Radio-Amateur „Broadcasting“. Ein Lehr- und Hilfsbuch für die Radio-Amateure aller Länder (The Radio Amateur "Broadcasting". A teaching and auxiliary book for the radio amateurs of all countries), 1923
