= Foucault pendulum =

Device to demonstrate Earth's rotation

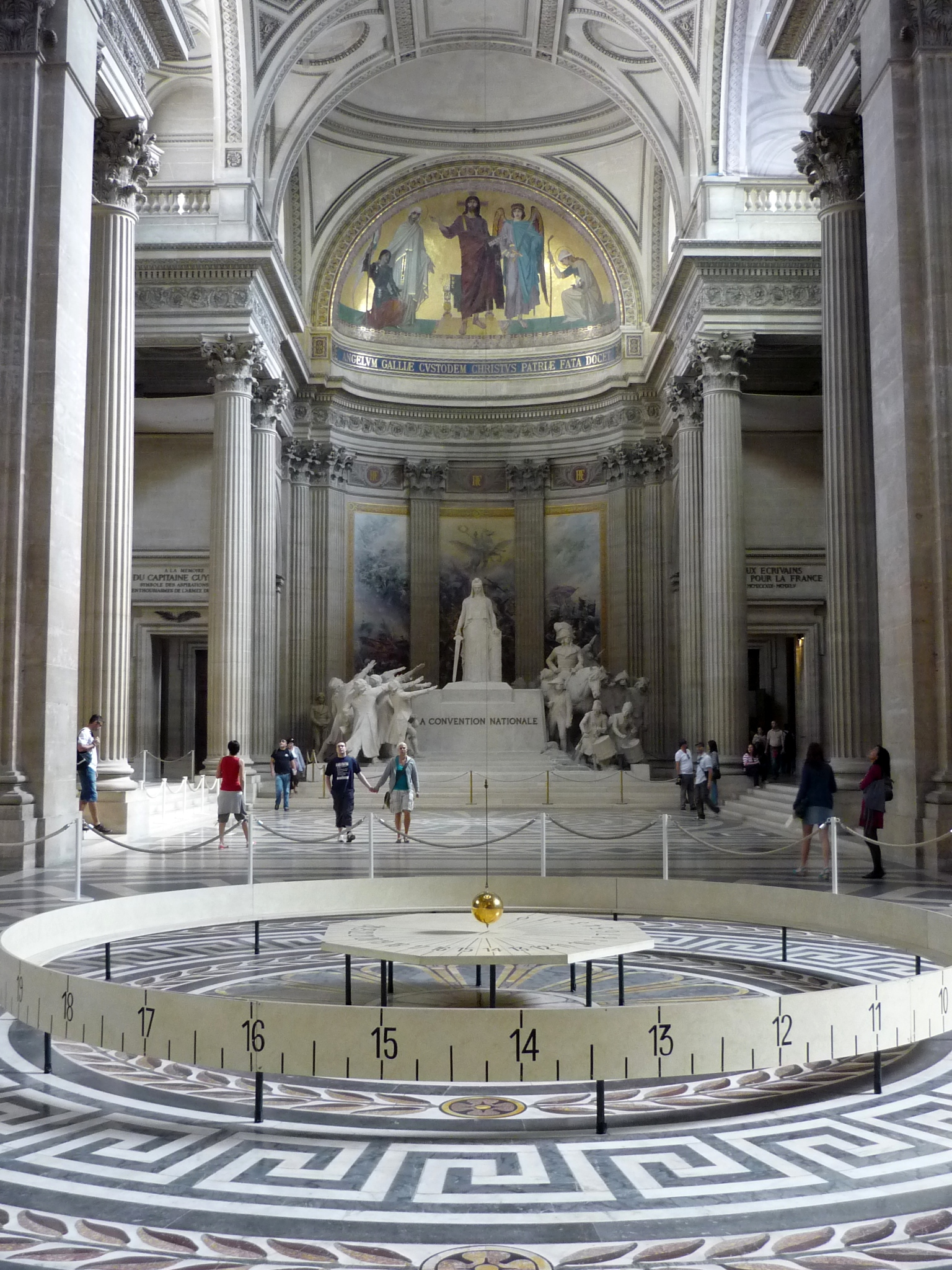
Foucault's pendulum in the Panthéon, Paris

The Foucault pendulum or Foucault's pendulum is a simple device named after French physicist Léon Foucault, conceived as an experiment to demonstrate the Earth's rotation. If a long and heavy pendulum suspended from the high roof above a circular area is monitored over an extended period of time, its plane of oscillation appears to change spontaneously as the Earth makes its 24-hourly rotation. This effect is greatest at the poles and diminishes with lower latitude until it no longer exists at Earth's equator.

Foucault introduced his pendulum in 1851 in the first experiment to give simple, direct evidence of the Earth's rotation, which he further demonstrated in 1852 with a gyroscope experiment. Foucault pendulums have become popular in science museums and universities.

== History ==
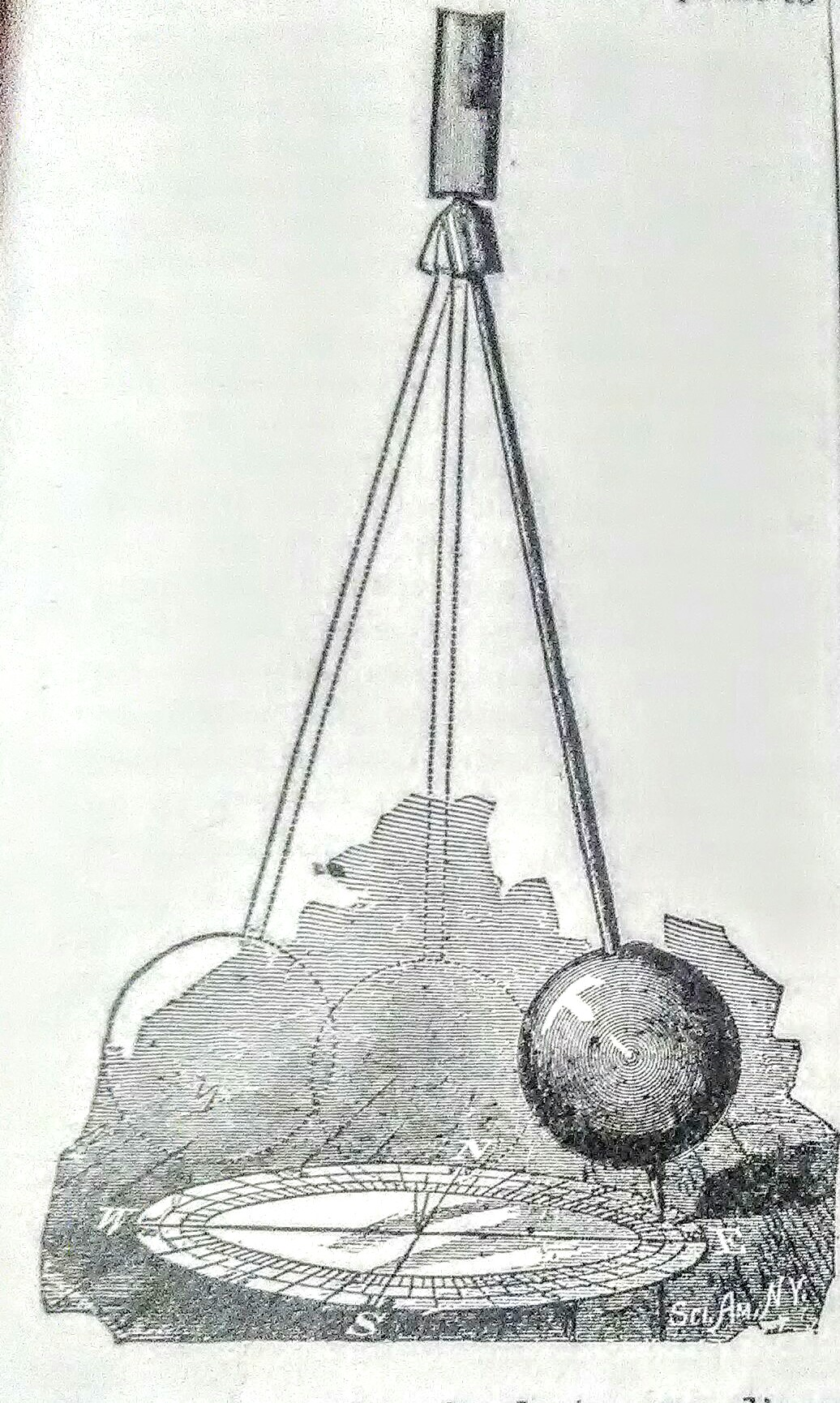
A print of the Foucault Pendulum, 1895

Foucault Pendulum at COSI Columbus knocking over a ball

Foucault was inspired by observing a thin flexible rod on the axis of a lathe, which vibrated in the same plane despite the rotation of the supporting frame of the lathe.

The first public exhibition of a Foucault pendulum took place in February 1851 in the Meridian of the Paris Observatory. A few weeks later, Foucault made his most famous pendulum when he suspended a 28-kilogram (62 lb) brass-coated lead bob with a 67-metre-long (220 ft) wire from the dome of the Panthéon, Paris.

Because the latitude of its location was $\phi = \mathrm{48^\circ 52' N}$, the plane of the pendulum's swing made a full circle in approximately $\frac{\mathrm{23h56'}}{\sin \phi} \approx \mathrm{31.8\,h} \;(\mathrm{31\,h\,50\,min})$, rotating clockwise approximately 11.3° per hour. The proper period of the pendulum was approximately $2\pi\sqrt{l/g}\approx 16.5 \,\mathrm{s}$, so with each oscillation, the pendulum rotates by about $9.05 \times 10^{-4} \mathrm{rad}$. Foucault reported observing 2.3 mm of deflection on the edge of a pendulum every oscillation, which is achieved if the pendulum swing angle is 2.1°.

Foucault explained his results in an 1851 paper entitled Physical demonstration of the Earth's rotational movement by means of the pendulum, published in the Comptes rendus de l'Académie des Sciences. He wrote that, at the North Pole:

...an oscillatory movement of the pendulum mass follows an arc of a circle whose plane is well known, and to which the inertia of matter ensures an unchanging position in space. If these oscillations continue for a certain time, the movement of the earth, which continues to rotate from west to east, will become sensitive in contrast to the immobility of the oscillation plane whose trace on the ground will seem animated by a movement consistent with the apparent movement of the celestial sphere; and if the oscillations could be perpetuated for twenty-four hours, the trace of their plane would then execute an entire revolution around the vertical projection of the point of suspension.

The original bob used in 1851 at the Panthéon was moved in 1855 to the Conservatoire des Arts et Métiers in Paris. A second temporary installation was made for the 50th anniversary in 1902.

During museum reconstruction in the 1990s, the original pendulum was temporarily displayed at the Panthéon (1995), but was later returned to the Musée des Arts et Métiers before it reopened in 2000. On April 6, 2010, the cable suspending the bob in the Musée des Arts et Métiers snapped, causing irreparable damage to the pendulum bob and to the marble flooring of the museum. The original, now damaged pendulum bob is displayed in a separate case adjacent to the current pendulum display.

An exact copy of the original pendulum has been operating under the dome of the Panthéon, Paris since 1995.

== Mechanism ==
Animation of a Foucault pendulum on the northern hemisphere, with the Earth's rotation rate and amplitude greatly exaggerated. The green trace shows the path of the pendulum bob over the ground (a rotating reference frame), while the bob moves in the corresponding vertical planes. The actual plane of swing appears to rotate relative to the Earth: sitting astride the bob like a swing, Coriolis fictitious force disappears: observer is in a "free rotational" reference. The wire should be as long as possible—lengths of 12–30 m (40–100 ft) are common.

Animated Foucault pendulum but with a trajectory on the ground which does not correspond to a bob launched without initial velocity

A Foucault pendulum at the North Pole: The pendulum swings within a single plane as the Earth rotates beneath it

The animation describes the motion of a Foucault pendulum at a latitude of 30°N. The plane of oscillation rotates by an angle of −180° during one day, so after two days, the plane returns to its original orientation

At either the Geographic North Pole or Geographic South Pole, the plane of oscillation of a pendulum remains fixed relative to the distant masses of the universe while Earth rotates underneath it, taking one sidereal day to complete a rotation. So, relative to Earth, the plane of oscillation of a pendulum at the North Pole (viewed from above) undergoes a full clockwise rotation during one day; a pendulum at the South Pole rotates counterclockwise.

When a Foucault pendulum is suspended at the equator, the plane of oscillation remains fixed relative to Earth. At other latitudes, the plane of oscillation precesses relative to Earth, but more slowly than at the pole; the angular speed, ω (measured in clockwise degrees per sidereal day), is proportional to the sine of the latitude, φ:

$$\omega=360^\circ\sin\varphi\ /\mathrm{day},$$

where latitudes north and south of the equator are defined as positive and negative, respectively. A "pendulum day" is the time needed for the plane of a freely suspended Foucault pendulum to complete an apparent rotation about the local vertical. This is one sidereal day divided by the sine of the latitude. For example, a Foucault pendulum at 30° south latitude, viewed from above by an earthbound observer, rotates counterclockwise 360° in two days.

Using enough wire length, the described circle can be wide enough that the tangential displacement along the measuring circle of between two oscillations can be visible by eye, rendering the Foucault pendulum a spectacular experiment: for example, the original Foucault pendulum in Panthéon moves circularly, with a 6-metre pendulum amplitude, by about 5 mm each period.

A Foucault pendulum requires care to set up because imprecise construction can cause additional veering which masks the terrestrial effect. Heike Kamerlingh Onnes (Nobel laureate 1913) performed precise experiments and developed a fuller theory of the Foucault pendulum for his doctoral thesis (1879). He observed the pendulum to go over from linear to elliptic oscillation in an hour. By a perturbation analysis, he showed that geometrical imperfection of the system or elasticity of the support wire may cause a beat between two horizontal modes of oscillation. The initial launch of the pendulum is also critical; the traditional way to do this is to use a flame to burn through a thread which temporarily holds the bob in its starting position, thus avoiding unwanted sideways motion (see a detail of the launch at the 50th anniversary in 1902).

Notably, veering of a pendulum was observed already in 1661 by Vincenzo Viviani, a student of Galileo, but there is no evidence that he connected the effect with the Earth's rotation; rather, he regarded it as a nuisance in his study that should be overcome with suspending the bob on two ropes instead of one.

Air resistance damps the oscillation, so some Foucault pendulums in museums incorporate an electromagnetic or other drive to keep the bob swinging; others are restarted regularly, sometimes with a launching ceremony as an added attraction. Besides air resistance (the use of a heavy symmetrical bob is to reduce friction forces, mainly air resistance by a symmetrical and aerodynamic bob) the other main engineering problem in creating a 1-meter Foucault pendulum nowadays is said to be ensuring there is no preferred direction of swing.

== Related physical systems ==
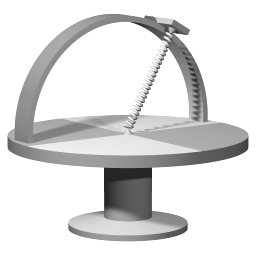
The device described by Wheatstone

Many physical systems precess in a similar manner to a Foucault pendulum. As early as 1836, the Scottish mathematician Edward Sang contrived and explained the precession of a spinning top. In 1851, Charles Wheatstone described an apparatus that consists of a vibrating spring that is mounted on top of a disk so that it makes a fixed angle φ with the disk. The spring is struck so that it oscillates in a plane. When the disk is turned, the plane of oscillation changes just like the one of a Foucault pendulum at latitude φ.

Similarly, consider a nonspinning, perfectly balanced bicycle wheel mounted on a disk so that its axis of rotation makes an angle φ with the disk. When the disk undergoes a full clockwise revolution, the bicycle wheel will not return to its original position, but will have undergone a net rotation of 2π sin φ.

Foucault-like precession is observed in anisotropic oscillators and in a virtual system wherein a massless particle is constrained to remain on a rotating plane that is inclined with respect to the axis of rotation.

Spin of a relativistic particle moving in a circular orbit precesses similar to the swing plane of Foucault pendulum. The relativistic velocity space in Minkowski spacetime can be treated as a sphere S^{3} in 4-dimensional Euclidean space with imaginary radius and imaginary timelike coordinate. Parallel transport of polarization vectors along such sphere gives rise to Thomas precession, which is analogous to the rotation of the swing plane of Foucault pendulum due to parallel transport along a sphere S^{2} in 3-dimensional Euclidean space.

In physics, the evolution of such systems is determined by geometric phases. Mathematically they are understood through parallel transport.

== Absolute reference frame for pendulum ==
The motion of a pendulum, such as the Foucault pendulum, is typically analyzed relative to an Inertial frame of reference, approximated by the "fixed stars." These stars, owing to their immense distance from Earth, exhibit negligible motion relative to one another over short timescales, making them a practical benchmark for physical calculations. While fixed stars are sufficient for physical analyses, the concept of an absolute reference frame introduces philosophical and theoretical considerations.

Newtonian absolute space

- Isaac Newton proposed the existence of "absolute space," a universal, immovable reference frame independent of any material objects. In his Principia Mathematica, Newton described absolute space as the backdrop against which true motion occurs.
- This concept was criticized by later thinkers, such as Ernst Mach, who argued that motion should only be defined relative to other masses in the universe.

Cosmic microwave background (CMB)

- The CMB, the remnant radiation from the Big Bang, provides a universal reference for cosmological observations. By measuring motion relative to the CMB, scientists can determine the velocity of celestial bodies, including Earth, relative to the universe's early state. This has led some to consider the CMB a modern analogue of an absolute reference frame.

Mach's principle and distant masses

- Ernst Mach proposed that inertia arises from the interaction of an object with the distant masses in the universe. According to this view, the pendulum's frame of reference might be defined by the distribution of all matter in the cosmos, rather than an abstract absolute space.
- The "distant masses of the universe" play a crucial role in defining the inertial frame, suggesting that the pendulum's apparent motion might be influenced by the collective gravitational effect of these masses. This perspective aligns with Mach's principle, emphasizing the interconnectedness of local and cosmic phenomena.
- However, the connection between Mach's principle and Einstein's general relativity remains unresolved. Einstein initially hoped to incorporate Mach's ideas but later acknowledged difficulties in doing so.

General relativity and spacetime

- General relativity suggests that spacetime itself can serve as a reference frame. The pendulum's motion might be understood as relative to the curvature of spacetime, which is influenced by nearby and distant masses. This view aligns with the concept of geodesics in curved spacetime.
- The Lense-Thirring effect, a prediction of general relativity, implies that massive rotating objects like Earth can slightly "drag" spacetime, which could affect the pendulum's oscillation. This effect, though theoretically significant, is currently too small to measure with a Foucault pendulum.

== Equation formulation for the Foucault pendulum ==
To model the Foucault pendulum, we consider a pendulum of length L and mass m, oscillating with small amplitudes. In a reference frame rotating with Earth at angular velocity Ω, the Coriolis force must be included. The equations of motion in the horizontal plane (x, y) are:

$$\begin{aligned}
\ddot{x} + \omega_0^2 x &= 2\Omega \sin(\varphi) \dot{y}, \\
\ddot{y} + \omega_0^2 y &= -2\Omega \sin(\varphi) \dot{x},
\end{aligned}$$

where:

- $\omega_0 = \sqrt{\frac{g}{L}}$ is the natural angular frequency of the pendulum,
- $\varphi$ is the latitude,
- $g$ is the acceleration due to gravity.

These coupled differential equations describe the pendulum's motion, incorporating the Coriolis effect due to Earth's rotation.

=== Precession rate calculation ===
The precession rate of the pendulum's oscillation plane depends on latitude. The angular precession rate $\Omega_p$ is given by:

$$\Omega_p = \Omega \sin(\varphi),$$

where $\Omega$ is Earth's angular rotation rate (approximately $7.2921 \times 10^{-5}$ radians per second).

=== Examples of precession periods ===
The time $T_p$ for a full rotation of the pendulum's plane is:

$$T_p = \frac{2\pi}{\Omega_p} = \frac{2\pi}{\Omega \sin(\varphi)}.$$

Calculations for specific locations:

- Paris, France (latitude $\varphi \approx 48.8566^\circ$):

$$\begin{aligned}
\Omega_p &= \Omega \sin(48.8566^\circ) \approx 7.2921 \times 10^{-5} \times 0.7547 \\
&\approx 5.506 \times 10^{-5} \, \text{radians/second}, \\
T_p &= \frac{2\pi}{5.506 \times 10^{-5}} \approx 114,105 \, \text{seconds} \\
&\approx 31.7 \, \text{hours}.
\end{aligned}$$

- New York City, USA (latitude $\varphi \approx 40.7128^\circ$):

$$\begin{aligned}
\Omega_p &= \Omega \sin(40.7128^\circ) \approx 7.2921 \times 10^{-5} \times 0.6523 \\
&\approx 4.757 \times 10^{-5} \, \text{radians/second}, \\
T_p &= \frac{2\pi}{4.757 \times 10^{-5}} \approx 132,000 \, \text{seconds} \\
&\approx 36.7 \, \text{hours}.
\end{aligned}$$

These calculations show that the pendulum's precession period varies with latitude, completing a full rotation more quickly at higher latitudes.

== Installations ==
There are numerous Foucault pendulums at universities, science museums, and the like throughout the world. The Marshall Pendulum in the Eyring Science Center at Brigham Young University is 12.8 m (42 ft) long. The United Nations General Assembly Building at the United Nations headquarters in New York City has one. The Oregon Convention Center pendulum is claimed to be the largest, its length approximately 27 m (89 ft), however, there are larger ones listed in the article, such as the one in Gamow Tower at the University of Colorado Boulder of 39.3 m (129 ft). There used to be much longer pendulums, such as the 98 m (322 ft) pendulum in Saint Isaac's Cathedral, Saint Petersburg, Russia.

The experiment has also been carried out at the South Pole, where it was assumed that the rotation of the Earth would have maximum effect. A pendulum was installed in a six-story staircase of a new station under construction at the Amundsen-Scott South Pole Station. It had a length of 33 m (108 ft) and the bob had a mass of 25 kg (55 lb). The location was ideal: no moving air could disturb the pendulum. The researchers confirmed about 24 hours as the rotation period of the plane of oscillation.

== See also ==
- Absolute rotation – Rotation independent of any external reference
- Eötvös experiment – Physics experiment
- Gyroscope – Device for measuring or maintaining orientation
- Lariat chain – Science demonstration
- Precession – Periodic change in the direction of a rotation axis
