= Léon Foucault =

French physicist (1819–1868)

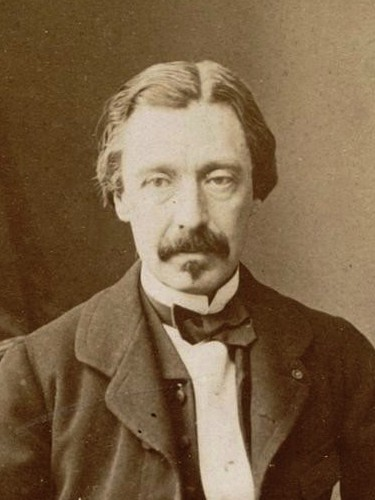
- Photograph by Bertall & Cie
- Born: Jean Bernard Léon Foucault; 18 September 1819; Paris, Kingdom of France
- Died: 11 February 1868 (aged 48); Paris, Second French Empire
- Resting place: Montmartre Cemetery
- Education: University of Paris
- Known for: Foucault knife-edge test Foucault pendulum Foucault's currents Foucault's gyroscope Foucault's measurements of the speed of light Glan–Foucault prism Diurnal motion Gyroscope; Catadioptric systems Silvering process
- Awards: Copley Medal (1855); FRS (1864)
- Scientific career
- Fields: Physics
- Workplaces: Paris Observatory
- Thesis: Sur les vitesses relatives de la lumière dans l'air et dans l'eau (1853)

Jean Bernard Léon Foucault (UK: /ʒɒ̃ ˈbɛərnɑːr ˌleɪɒ̃ ˈfuːkoʊ/, US: /ˌʒɒ̃ bɛərˈnɑːr leɪˌɒ̃ fuːˈkoʊ/; French: [ʒɑ̃ bɛʁnaʁ leɔ̃ fuko]; 18 September 1819 – 11 February 1868) was a French physicist who invented the Foucault pendulum, a device demonstrating the effect of Earth's rotation. He also made an early measurement of the speed of light, discovered eddy currents, and is credited with naming the gyroscope.

== Life ==
=== Early years and education ===
The son of a publisher, Foucault was born in Paris on 18 September 1819. After an education received chiefly at home, he studied medicine, which he abandoned in favour of physics due to a blood phobia.

=== Career ===
He first directed his attention to the improvement of Louis Daguerre's photographic processes. For three years he was experimental assistant to Alfred Donné (1801–1878) in his course of lectures on microscopic anatomy.

With Hippolyte Fizeau he carried out a series of investigations on the intensity of the light of the sun, as compared with that of carbon in the arc lamp, and of lime in the flame of the oxyhydrogen blowpipe; on the interference of infrared radiation, and of light rays differing greatly in lengths of path; and on the chromatic polarization of light.

In 1849, Foucault experimentally demonstrated that absorption and emission lines appearing at the same wavelength are both due to the same material, with the difference between the two originating from the temperature of the light source.

Foucault's pendulum in the Panthéon, Paris

In 1850, he did an experiment using a rotating mirror to measure the speed of light; it was viewed as "driving the last nail in the coffin" of Newton's corpuscular theory of light when it showed that light travels more slowly through water than through air. In 1851, he provided an experimental demonstration of the rotation of the Earth on its axis (diurnal motion). This experimental setup had been used by Vincenzo Viviani but became well known to the public by Foucault's work. Foucault achieved the demonstration by showing the rotation of the plane of oscillation of a long and heavy pendulum suspended from the roof of the Panthéon, Paris. The experiment caused a sensation in both the learned and popular worlds, and "Foucault pendulums" were suspended in major cities across Europe and America and attracted crowds. In the following year he used (and named) the gyroscope as a conceptually simpler experimental proof (see Foucault's gyroscope experiment). In 1855, he received the Copley Medal of the Royal Society for his 'very remarkable experimental researches'. Earlier in the same year he was made physicien (physicist) at the imperial observatory at Paris.

In September 1855 he discovered that the force required for the rotation of a copper disc becomes greater when it is made to rotate with its rim between the poles of a magnet, the disc at the same time becoming heated by the eddy current or "Foucault currents" induced in the metal.

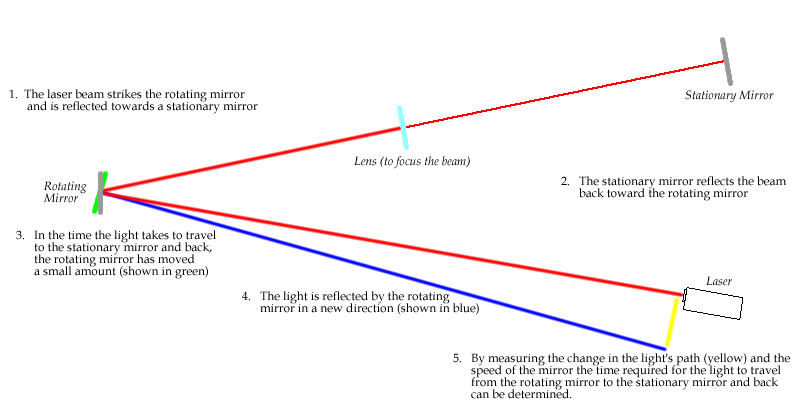
Diagram of a variant of Foucault's speed of light experiment where a modern laser is the source of light

In 1857 Foucault invented the polarizer which bears his name, and in the succeeding year devised a method of testing the mirror of a reflecting telescope to determine its shape. The so-called "Foucault knife-edge test" allows the worker to tell if the mirror is perfectly spherical or has non-spherical deviation in its figure. Prior to Foucault's publication of his findings, the testing of reflecting telescope mirrors was a "hit or miss" proposition.

Foucault's knife edge test determines the shape of a mirror by finding the focal lengths of its areas, commonly called zones and measured from the mirror center. In the test, light from a point source is focused onto the center of curvature of the mirror and reflected back to a knife edge. The test enables the tester to quantify the conic section of the mirror, thereby allowing the tester to validate the actual shape of the mirror, which is necessary to obtain optimal performance of the optical system. The Foucault test is in use to this date, most notably by amateur and smaller commercial telescope makers as it is inexpensive and uses simple, easily made equipment.

With Charles Wheatstone’s revolving mirror he, in 1862, determined the speed of light to be 298,000 km/s – 10,000 km/s less than that obtained by previous experimenters and only 0.6% in error of the currently accepted value.

=== Later years and death ===
In 1862 Foucault was made a member of the Bureau des Longitudes and an officer of the Legion of Honour. He became a member of the Royal Society of London in 1864, and member of the mechanical section of the Institute a year later. In 1865 he published his papers on a modification of James Watt's centrifugal governor; he had for some time been experimenting with a view to making its period of revolution constant and developing a new apparatus for regulating the electric light. Foucault showed how, by the deposition of a transparently thin film of silver on the outer side of the object glass of a telescope, the sun could be viewed without injuring the eye. His chief scientific papers are to be found in the Comptes Rendus, 1847–1869. Near his death he returned to Roman Catholicism that he previously abandoned.

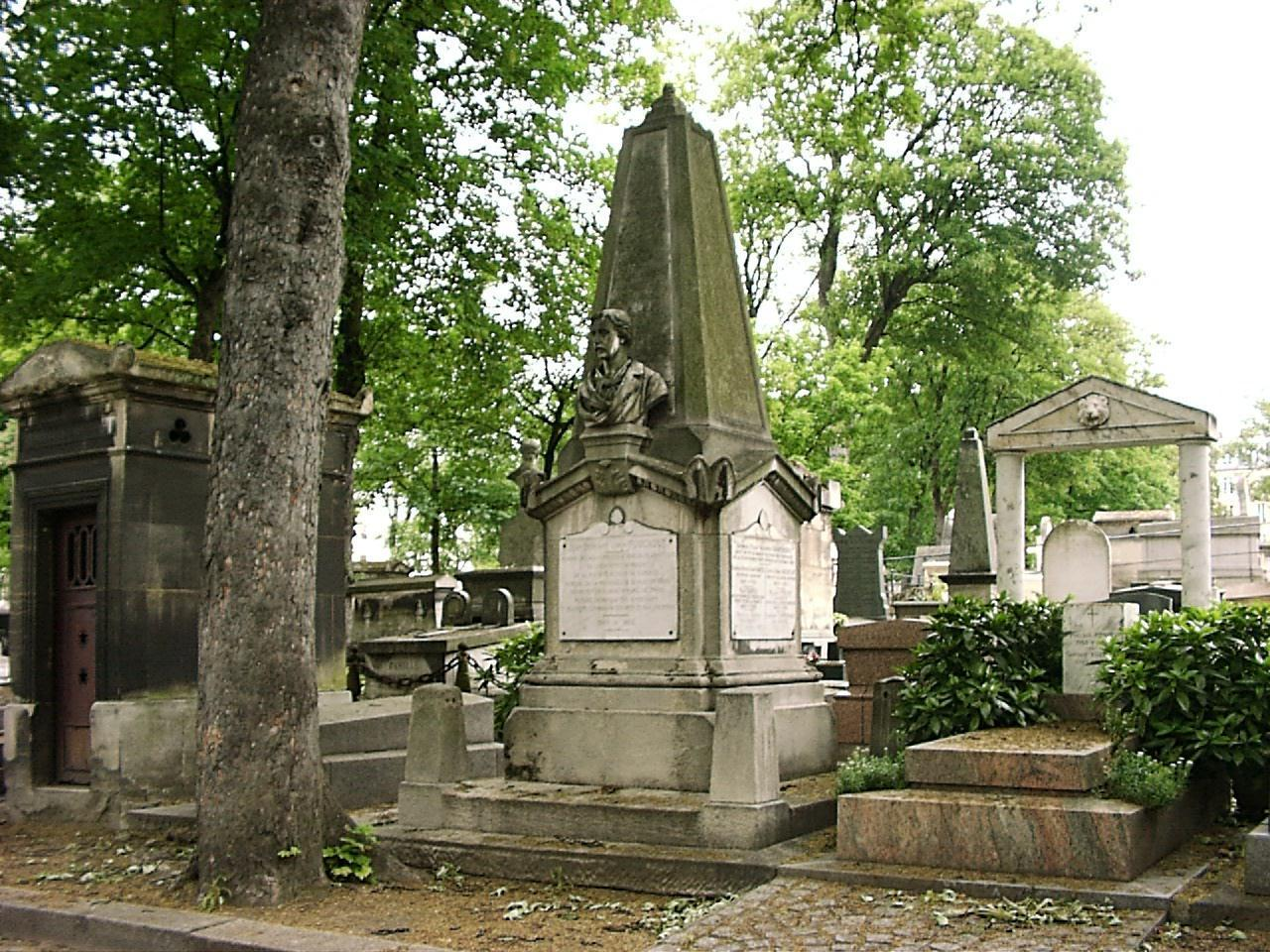
Grave of Jean Bernard Léon Foucault in Montmartre Cemetery

Foucault died of what was probably a rapidly developing case of multiple sclerosis on 11 February 1868 in Paris and was buried in the Montmartre Cemetery.

== Honours ==
The asteroid 5668 Foucault is named for him, as is Foucault crater on the Moon. His is one of the 72 names inscribed on the Eiffel Tower.

== Bibliography ==
Collected Works:

- Recueil des travaux scientifiques de Léon Foucault Volume One, Volume Two, 1878. (Université de Strasbourg) or Internet Archive (US)
- Donné & Foucault Atlas of medical micrographs 1845

== See also ==
- Schlieren
