= Fizeau–Foucault apparatus =

Fizeau–Foucault apparatus may refer to either of two nineteenth-century experiments to measure the speed of light:

- Fizeau's measurement of the speed of light in air, using a toothed wheel
- Foucault's measurements of the speed of light, using a rotating mirror

== See also ==
- Hippolyte Fizeau
- Léon Foucault
