= Alfred Cornu =

French physicist (1841–1902)

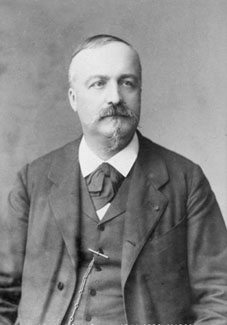
- Born: Marie Alfred Cornu; 6 March 1841; Orléans, France
- Died: 12 April 1902 (aged 61); Romorantin-Lanthenay, France
- Education: École polytechnique Éccole de mines
- Known for: Cornu depolarizer Cornu spiral Cornu's refinement of the Fizeau experiment
- Relatives: Marie Maxime Cornu (brother)
- Awards: Rede Lecture (1899); ForMemRS (1884); Rumford Medal (1878)
- Scientific career
- Fields: Physics
- Workplaces: École polytechnique
- Thesis: Recherches sur la réflexion cristalline (1867)
- Notable students: Albert A. Michelson

Marie Alfred Cornu (French: [kɔʁny]; 6 March 1841 – 12 April 1902) was a French physicist and professor of École polytechnique. The Cornu spiral, a graphical device for the computation of light intensities in Augustin-Jean Fresnel's model of near-field diffraction, is named after him. The spiral (or clothoid) is also used in geometric design of roads. The Cornu depolarizer is also named after him.

== Life ==
Cornu was born at Orléans to François Cornu and Sophie Poinsellier. He was educated at the École polytechnique and the École des mines. Upon the death of Émile Verdet in 1866, Cornu became, in 1867, Verdet's successor as professor of experimental physics at the École polytechnique, where he remained throughout his life.

Although he made various excursions into other branches of physical science, undertaking, for example, with Jean-Baptistin Baille about 1870 a repetition of Cavendish's experiment for determining the gravitational constant G, his original work was mainly concerned with optics and spectroscopy. In particular he carried out a replication of Hippolyte Fizeau's method to measure the speed of light (see Fizeau's measurement of the speed of light in air), introducing various improvements in the apparatus, which added greatly to the accuracy of the results. This achievement won for him, in 1878, the prix Lacaze and membership of the French Academy of Sciences (l'Académie des sciences), and the Rumford Medal of the Royal Society in England. He was awarded honorary membership of the Manchester Literary and Philosophical Society in 1887.

In 1892, he was elected a member of the Royal Swedish Academy of Sciences. In 1896, he became president of the French Academy of Sciences. Cornu was the President of the Société Astronomique de France (SAF), the French astronomical society, from 1897-1899. In 1899, at the jubilee commemoration of Sir George Stokes, he was Rede lecturer at Cambridge, his subject being the wave theory of light and its influence on modern physics; and on that occasion the honorary degree of D.Sc. was conferred on him by the university. He died at Romorantin on 12 April 1902.

In 1900, he organized the first International Congress of Physics in Paris, during the Exposition Universelle.

Cornu developed the theory of varied line-space diffraction gratings.
