= Foucault's measurements of the speed of light =

Scientific instrument used to measure the speed of light

In 1850, Léon Foucault used a rotating mirror to perform a differential measurement of the speed of light in water versus its speed in air. Together with a similar measurement by Hippolyte Fizeau, this result confirmed the wave behavior of light. In 1862, Foucault used a similar apparatus to measure the speed of light in the air, obtaining a value within 0.6% of the modern value. Albert A. Michelson extended that technique in a series of experiments from 1877 to 1930, approaching the modern value to within 0.05%.

== Background ==
In 1834, Charles Wheatstone developed a method of using a rapidly rotating mirror to study electric sparks and applied this method to measure the velocity of electricity in a wire. François Arago proposed the idea that Wheatstone's method could be adapted to a study of the speed of light.

The early-to-mid 1800s were a period of intense debate on the particle-versus-wave nature of light. Although the observation of the Arago spot in 1819 may have seemed to settle the matter definitively in favor of Fresnel's wave theory of light, various concerns continued to appear to be addressed more satisfactorily by Newton's corpuscular theory. Arago expanded upon Wheatstone's concept in an 1838 publication, suggesting that a differential comparison of the speed of light in the air versus water would serve to distinguish between the particle and wave theories of light.

Foucault had worked with Hippolyte Fizeau on projects such as using the Daguerreotype process to take images of the Sun between 1843 and 1845 and characterizing absorption bands in the infrared spectrum of sunlight in 1847. In 1845, Arago suggested to Fizeau and Foucault that they attempt to measure the speed of light. Sometime in 1849, however, it appears that the two had a falling out, and they parted ways. That year, Fizeau reported the result of using, not a rotating mirror, but a toothed wheel apparatus to perform an absolute measurement of the speed of light in air.

In 1850, Fizeau and Foucault both used rotating mirror devices to perform relative measures of the speed of light in the air versus water.

Foucault employed Paul-Gustave Froment to build a rotary-mirror apparatus in which he split a beam of light into two beams, passing one through the water while the other traveled through air. On 27 April 1850, he confirmed that the speed of light was greater as it traveled through the air, seemingly validating the wave theory of light. (Note: Given our modern understanding of light, it may be rather difficult to grasp why a particle model of light should have been expected to predict a higher velocity of light in water than in air. (1) Following Descartes, it was believed (falsely) that when a beam of light crosses an air/water interface, the tangential component of its velocity (i.e. its velocity parallel to the surface) should be conserved. If that were so, then the observed fact that the refraction angle is smaller than the incident angle when a beam of light enters water necessarily implies a higher velocity in water. (2) Sound was known to travel faster in solids and liquids than in air. (3) Newton presumed a sort of gravitational attraction of light particles by water in the direction normal to the air/water surface. This would account for Snell's Law and in agreement with Descartes would imply no change in the velocity component parallel to the surface.)

With Arago's blessing, Fizeau employed L.F.C. Breguet to construct his apparatus. They achieved their result on 17 June 1850, seven weeks after Foucault.

To achieve the high rotational speeds necessary, Foucault abandoned clockwork and used a carefully balanced steam-powered apparatus designed by Charles Cagniard de la Tour. Foucault originally used tin-mercury mirrors, however at speeds exceeding 200 rps, the reflecting layer would break off, so he switched to using new silvered mirrors.

== Foucault's determination of the speed of light ==
Figure 1: In Foucault's experiment, lens L forms an image of slit S at spherical mirror M. If mirror R is stationary, the reflected image of the slit reforms at the original position of slit S regardless of how R is tilted, as shown in the lower annotated figure. However, if R rotates rapidly, the time delay due to the finite speed of light traveling from R to M and back to R results in the reflected image of the slit at S becoming displaced.

=== 1850 experiment ===
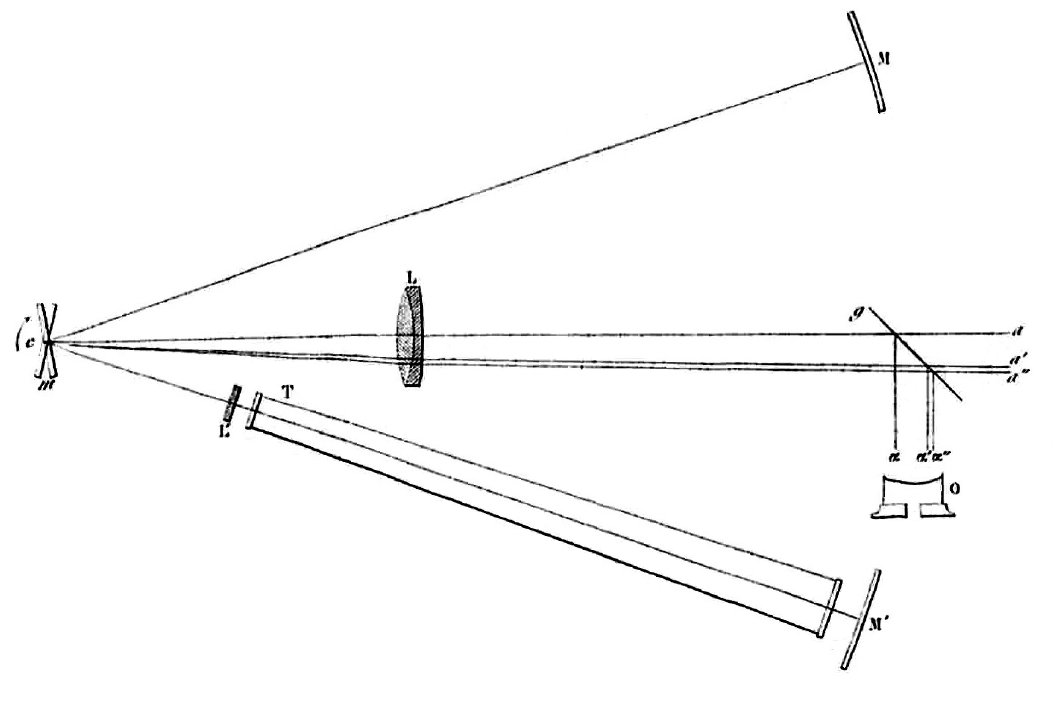
Figure 2: Foucault's determination of the relative speed of light in air vs water. Light from a passing through a slit (not shown) is reflected by mirror m (rotating clockwise around c) towards the concave spherical mirrors M and M'. Lens L forms images of the slit on the surfaces of the two concave mirrors. The light path from m to M is entirely through air, while the light path from m to M' is mostly through a water-filled tube T. Lens L' compensates for the effects of the water on the focus. The light reflected back from the spherical mirrors is diverted by beam splitter g towards an eyepiece O. If mirror m is stationary, both images of the slit reflected by M and M' reform at position α. If mirror m is rapidly rotating, light reflected from M forms an image of the slit at α' while light reflected from M' forms an image of the slit at α".

In 1850, Léon Foucault measured the relative speeds of light in air and water. The experiment was described by Foucault as proposal by Arago, who wrote,

Two radiating points placed one near the other and on the same vertical, shine instantly in front of a rotating mirror. The rays from the upper point reach this mirror only by passing through a tube filled with water; the rays of the second point reach the reflective surface having encountered in their course no medium other than air... [S]uppose that the mirror, seen from the place occupied by the observer, turns right to left. Well! if the emission theory is true, if the light is matter, the highest point will seem to the left of the lower point; he will appear on his right, on the contrary, if the light results from the vibrations of an ethereal medium.

The apparatus (Figure 1) involves light passing through slit S, reflecting off a mirror R, and forming an image of the slit on the distant stationary mirror M. The light then passes back to mirror R and is reflected back to the original slit. If mirror R is stationary, then the slit image will reform at S.

If the mirror R is rotating, it will have moved slightly in the time it takes for the light to bounce from R to M and back, and the light will be deflected away from the original source by a small angle, forming an image to the side of the slit.

Foucault measured the differential speed of light through air versus water by using two distant mirrors (Figure 2). He placed a 3-meter tube of water before one of them. The light passing through the slower medium has its image more displaced. By partially masking the air-path mirror, Foucault was able to distinguish the two images super-imposed on top of one another. He found the speed of light was slower in water than in air.

This experiment did not determine the absolute speeds of light in water or air, only their relative speeds. The rotational speed of the mirror could not be sufficiently accurately measured to determine the absolute speeds of light in water or air. With a rotational speed of 600-800 revolutions per second, the displacement was 0.2 to 0.3 mm.

Guided by similar motivations as his former partner, Foucault in 1850 was more interested in settling the particle-versus-wave debate than in determining an accurate absolute value for the speed of light. (Note: Contemporary accounts of Fizeau's and Foucault's 1850 experiments refer to their relative speed determinations as a decisive experimentum crucis of emission theory, without mentioning any absolute speed measurements. For example, the Literary Gazette for June 29, 1850 (p 441) reported "The results of the experiments of MM. Fizeau and Brequet [sic], on the comparative quickness of light in air and in water, strongly support the undulatory theory of light. If the lengths traversed by two luminous rays, the one through the air and the other through a column of water, were the same for the two media, the time of passing would have been in the ratio of four to three, according to the one or the other theory, and the deviations of the rays produced by the rotation of the mirror would have been in the same ratio." See also the Literary Gazette for September 5, 1857 (p 855).) His experimental results, announced shortly before Fizeau announced his results on the same topic, were viewed as "driving the last nail in the coffin" of Newton's corpuscle theory of light when it showed that light travels more slowly through water than through air. Newton had explained refraction as a pull of the medium upon the light, implying an increased speed of light in the medium. The corpuscular theory of light went into abeyance, completely overshadowed by the wave theory. (Note: The seemingly complete triumph of wave theory over corpuscular theory required postulating the existence of an all-pervasive luminiferous aether, since otherwise it was impossible to conceive of light crossing empty space. The hypothetical aether, however, was required to have a large number of implausible characteristics. For example, in his eponymous Fizeau experiment of 1851, Fizeau demonstrated that the speed of light through a moving column of water does not equal a simple additive sum of the speed of light through the water plus the speed of the water itself. Other difficulties were glossed over until the Michelson–Morley experiment of 1887 failed to detect any trace of the aether's effects. In 1892, Hendrik Lorentz postulated an ad hoc set of behaviors for the aether that could explain Michelson and Morley's null result, but the true explanation had to await Einstein's Special Theory of Relativity.) This state of affairs lasted until 1905, when Einstein presented heuristic arguments that under various circumstances, such as when considering the photoelectric effect, light exhibits behaviors indicative of a particle nature.

For his efforts, Foucault was made chevalier of the Légion d'honneur, and in 1853 was awarded a doctorate from the Sorbonne.

=== 1862 experiment ===
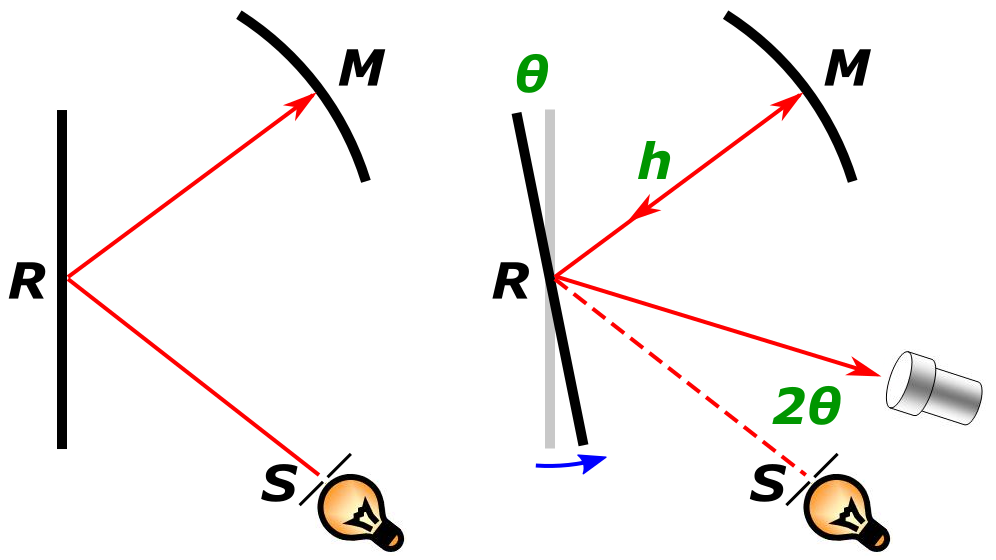
Figure 3: Schematic of the Foucault apparatus. Left panel: Mirror R is stationary. Lens L (not shown) forms an image of slit S on spherical mirror M. The reflected image of the slit reforms at the original position of slit S regardless of how R is tilted. Right panel: Mirror R is rotating rapidly. The reflected light from mirror M bounces from mirror R that has advanced an angle θ during the transit of the light. The telescope detects the reflected image of the slit at angle 2θ relative to the position of slit S.

In Foucault's 1862 experiment, he desired to obtain an accurate absolute value for the speed of light, since his concern was to deduce an improved value for the astronomical unit. (Note: The astronomical unit provides the basic distance scale for all measurements of the universe. Ascertaining its precise value was a major goal of 19th century astronomers: the task was in fact identified by the Astronomer Royal, George Airy, in 1857 as "the worthiest problem of Astronomy". Until the 1850s, its value had been determined by relatively inaccurate parallax methods such as measuring the position of Mars against the fixed stars from widely separated points on Earth, or monitoring the rare transits of Venus. An accurate speed of light would enable independent evaluations of the astronomical unit, for instance by reasoning backwards from Bradley's formula for stellar aberration or by reasoning backwards from measurements of the speed of light based on observations of Jupiter's satellites, i.e. Rømer's method.) At the time, Foucault was working at the Paris Observatory under Urbain le Verrier. It was le Verrier's belief, based on extensive celestial mechanics calculations, that the consensus value for the speed of light was perhaps 4% too high. Technical limitations prevented Foucault from separating mirrors R and M by more than about 20 meters. Despite this limited path length, Foucault was able to measure the displacement of the slit image (less than 1 mm) with considerable accuracy. In addition, unlike the case with Fizeau's experiment (which required gauging the rotation rate of an adjustable-speed toothed wheel), he could spin the mirror at a constant, chronometrically determined speed. Foucault's measurement confirmed le Verrier's estimate. His 1862 figure for the speed of light (298000 km/s) was within 0.6% of the modern value.

As seen in Figure 3, the displaced image of the source (slit) is at an angle 2θ from the source direction.

If the distance between mirrors is h, the time between the first and second reflections on the rotating mirror is 2h/c (c = speed of light). If the mirror rotates at a known constant angular rate ω, it changes angle during the light roundtrip by an amount θ given by:

$$\theta =  \frac {2h \omega}{c}=\omega t \ .$$

The speed of light is calculated from the observed angle θ, known angular speed ω and measured distance h as

$$c = \frac {2 \omega h}{\theta } \ .$$

== Michelson's refinement of the Foucault experiment ==
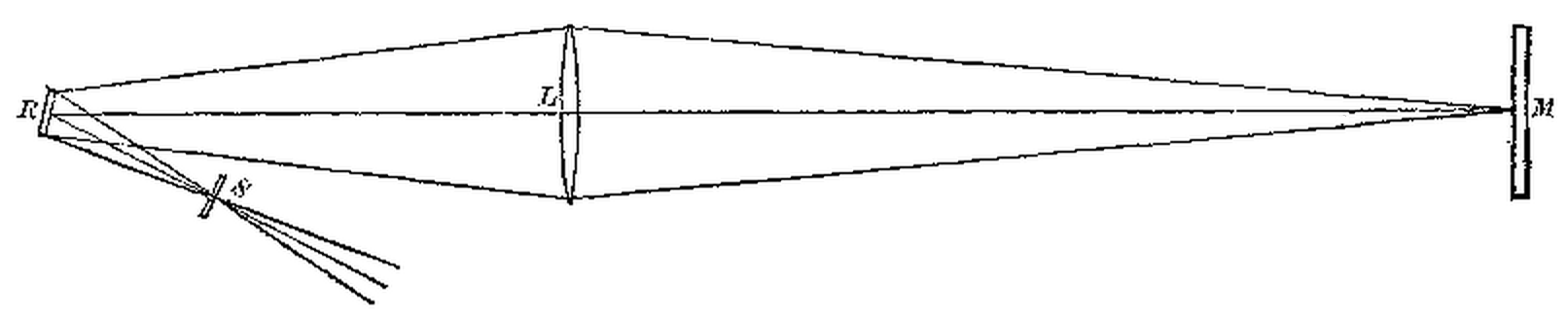
Figure 4: Michelson's 1879 repetition of Foucault's speed of light determination incorporated several improvements enabling use of a much longer light path.

It was seen in Figure 1 that Foucault placed the rotating mirror R as close as possible to lens L so as to maximize the distance between R and the slit S. As R rotates, an enlarged image of slit S sweeps across the face of the distant mirror M. The greater the distance RM, the more quickly that the image sweeps across mirror M and the less light is reflected back. Foucault could not increase the RM distance in his folded optical arrangement beyond about 20 meters without the image of the slit becoming too dim to accurately measure.

Between 1877 and 1931, Albert A. Michelson made multiple measurements of the speed of light. His 1877–79 measurements were performed under the auspices of Simon Newcomb, who was also working on measuring the speed of light. Michelson's setup incorporated several refinements on Foucault's original arrangement. As seen in Figure 4, Michelson placed the rotating mirror R near the principal focus of lens L (i.e. the focal point given incident parallel rays of light). If the rotating mirror R were exactly at the principal focus, the moving image of the slit would remain upon the distant plane mirror M (equal in diameter to lens L) as long as the axis of the pencil of light remained on the lens, this being true regardless of the RM distance. Michelson was thus able to increase the RM distance to nearly 2000 feet. To achieve a reasonable value for the RS distance, Michelson used an extremely long focal length lens (150 feet) and compromised on the design by placing R about 15 feet closer to L than the principal focus. This allowed an RS distance of between 28.5 and 33.3 feet. He used carefully calibrated tuning forks to monitor the rotation rate of the air-turbine-powered mirror R, and he would typically measure displacements of the slit image on the order of 115 mm. His 1879 figure for the speed of light, 299944±51 km/s, was within about 0.05% of the modern value. His 1926 repeat of the experiment incorporated still further refinements such as the use of polygonal prism-shaped rotating mirrors (enabling a brighter image) having from eight through sixteen facets and a 22 mile baseline surveyed to fractional parts-per-million accuracy. His figure of 299,796±4 km/s was only about 4 km/s higher than the current accepted value. Michelson's final 1931 attempt to measure the speed of light in vacuum was interrupted by his death. Although his experiment was completed posthumously by F. G. Pease and F. Pearson, various factors militated against a measurement of highest accuracy, including an earthquake which disturbed the baseline measurement.

== See also ==
- Speed of light § Measurement
- Fizeau's measurement of the speed of light in water
- Fizeau's measurement of the speed of light in air
