= Speed of electricity =

Rate of travel of electric energy

The speed of electricity can refer to the velocity of an electron in various circumstances, the average velocity of multiple electrons in a conductor, or the velocity of electrical signals. Electricity is usually associated with the movement of electrons, or other charge carriers, through a conductor in the presence of an electric potential difference or an electric field. In everyday electrical and electronic devices, signals (such as a pulse) travel as electromagnetic waves around the conductors typically at 50%–99% of the speed of light in vacuum. However, the electrons themselves move much more slowly (see drift velocity and electron mobility).

== History ==
By the 1740s, William Watson had conducted several experiments to determine the speed at which electrical impulses travel along wire. Watson, in the fields north of London, laid out a line of wire supported by dry sticks and silk which ran for 12,276 feet (3.7 km). Even at this length, this speed seemed to be instantaneous. In 1834, Charles Wheatstone developed a method of using a rapidly rotating mirror to study electric sparks and applied this method to measure the velocity of electrical impulses in a wire, finding a value one and half times the speed of light. In 1850, Hippolyte Fizeau and Gounelle used a similar method but obtained values of 1/3 the speed of light for iron wire and 2/3 the speed of light for copper wire.

By 1854, Michael Faraday, studying submarine cables for telegraphy, showed that these variations were partly due to different electrostatic capacitance in the cables. Telegraphers had observed that the undersea cable delayed and greatly elongated each signal. Faraday explained that electricity was not a fluid flowing through the cable but a propagating disturbance, the first use of the electric field idea. The cable, being a conductor surrounded by an insulator (gutta-percha), running in seawater, another conductor, had enormous capacitance, which each telegraph pulse had to fill before generating current in the cable conductor, which only then would propagate further down the cable.

By 1854, George Stokes and William Thomson had developed a theory for submarine cables that neglected cable inductance. According to these equations, electricity diffuses along the wires analogously to heat conduction. There is no single speed of propagation: for harmonic signals, the speed varies with the frequency of the signal applied. When a potential is applied suddenly, the current at the far end reaches a fixed fraction of its maximum value with a time delay proportional to the square of the cable length. Pathologically, the theory also predicted an instantaneous effect, independent of the cable length. The theory also showed that telegraph wires in air behave differently. The electrical advisor to the Atlantic Telegraph Company claimed Stokes and Thomson were wrong, saying a small diameter cable at higher voltage would solve the telegraph problem. The cable was laid but failed.

In 1857 Gustav Kirchhoff derived similar formulas, showing that an ideal, perfectly conducting wire propagates at a single speed numerically equal to the speed of light. However, he did not consider this coincidence to be significant.

The analysis of the telegraph cables was extended by Oliver Heaviside, who included the effect of cable inductance and obtained in 1881 the telegrapher's equations.

In 1888, Heinrich Hertz reported experimental results that came to be considered the discovery of electromagnetic waves. As part of his initial reports, he claimed that the speed of wave propagation along a wire was significantly slower than the speed in air. This would contradict Maxwell's model, which predicted only a wave in air, guided by the wire. Modern analysis shows that Hertz experimented with unshielded conductors and his results depended strongly on the arrangement of his laboratory. At the time of his reports, these speed measurements were largely ignored. Hertz's report of waves in air, however, had a wide impact because it led, in a few years time, to the development of radio by John Ambrose Fleming and Guglielmo Marconi.

== Electron velocity ==
The typical or average velocity of an electron in a conductor with no electric field is well estimated in the free electron model by the Fermi velocity, which is the reduced Planck constant divided by the electron mass times $k_f$, a material property for each specific conductor:
$$v_F = \frac{\hbar}{m}k_f$$
The value of $k_f$ for metals is around 1×10^{8} cm^{−1} so the Fermi velocity is around 1×10^{8} cm/s, about 1% of the speed of light. Absent an electric field, the free electrons travel in random directions, changing directions about every 10 nm, a distance known as the mean free path. These free electrons are a small fraction of the total electrons in a metal: most of the electrons are core electrons bound to the positive nuclei of the metal and do not participate in the velocity of electricity.

The velocity of free electrons in a conductor subject to a constant electric field is called the drift velocity. The entire collection of electrons becomes an electric current. Direct current electricity means the current in the conductor is in a constant (over time) E field (at a particular location in the conductor). In an electric field $E$ an electron in a conductor of mass $m$ will experience a force accelerating it between collisions; each collision reduces the average velocity to zero (i.e., randomizes the direction and magnitude). The average velocity added to the electron will be
$$v_\textrm{avg} = -\frac{e E \tau}{m}$$
where the relaxation time, $\tau$, is half the average time between collisions. Models for the relaxation time depend on the dynamics of collisions, and simple models are not very reliable. Typical values at room temperature are around $\tau \approx 10^{-14}$s. The resulting direct-current density, $j$, for $n$ free (i.e., conduction band) electrons per cubic meter will be proportional to the electron velocity:
$$j = -e n v_\textrm{avg} = ( \frac{n e^2 \tau }{m}) E .$$
This is a form of Ohm's Law with the quantity multiplying the electric field strength being the conductivity, the reciprocal of the resistivity. For a current density of 1 ampere per square millimeter, the velocity will be about 0.1 cm/s.

Alternating current causes no net movement. The electrons travel back and forth with the alternating electric potential. Simple models for the velocity of the electrons continue to work as long as the spatial variation of the electric field is small over a distance the electron travels between collisions, the mean free path. The spatial variation is given by the wavelength of the electromagnetic field and wavelengths as short as those in the visible light range satisfy this criterion.

== Signal velocity ==
Energy or signals from a source to a load or receiver flow outside of the electric conductor of a cable. The conductors function as a guide for the energy-carrying wave rather conveying energy internally to the load. The speed at which energy or signals travel down a cable is actually the speed of the electromagnetic wave traveling along (guided by) the cable; i.e., a cable is a form of a waveguide. The propagation of the wave is affected by the interaction with the material(s) in and surrounding the cable.

=== Velocity of electromagnetic waves in good dielectrics ===
The velocity of electromagnetic waves in a low-loss dielectric is given by
$$v = \frac {1} \sqrt{\varepsilon \mu} =\frac {c} \sqrt{\varepsilon_r \mu_r}$$

where:

- $c$ = speed of light in vacuum.
- $\mu_0$ = the permeability of free space = 4π × 10^{−7} H/m
- $\mu_r$ = relative magnetic permeability of the material. Usually in good dielectrics, e.g., vacuum, air, Teflon, $\mu_r = 1$
- $\mu = \mu_r \mu_0$
- $\varepsilon_0$ = the permittivity of free space = 8.854×10^{−12} F/m
- $\varepsilon_r$ = relative permittivity of the material. Usually in good conductors, e.g., copper, silver, gold, $\varepsilon_r = 1$
- $\varepsilon = \varepsilon_r \varepsilon_0$

=== Velocity of electromagnetic waves in good conductors ===
The velocity of transverse electromagnetic (TEM) mode waves in a good conductor is given by
$$v = \sqrt{ \frac {2 \omega} {\sigma \mu}} = \sqrt{ \frac {4 \pi} {\sigma_c \mu_0 }} \sqrt{ \frac { f } {\sigma_r \mu_r }} \approx \left (0.41 ~ \mathrm{ m/s } \right) \sqrt{ \frac { f / ( 1 ~ \mathrm{Hz} ) } {\sigma_r \mu_r }}$$

where:

- $f$ = frequency
- $\omega$ = angular frequency = 2πf
- $\sigma_c$ = conductivity of annealed copper = 5.96×10^{7} S/m
- $\sigma_r$ = conductivity of the material relative to the conductivity of copper. For hard-drawn copper $\sigma_r$ may be as low as 0.97
- $\sigma = \sigma_r \sigma_c$

and permeability is defined as above in § Velocity of electromagnetic waves in good dielectrics:

- $\mu_0$ = the permeability of free space = 4π × 10^{−7} H/m
- $\mu_r$ = relative magnetic permeability of the material. Nonmagnetic conductive materials such as copper typically have a $\mu_r$ near 1
- $\mu = \mu_r \mu_0$

This velocity is the speed with which electromagnetic waves penetrate into the conductor and is not the drift velocity of the conduction electrons. In copper at 60 Hz, $v \approx$ 3.2 m/s. As a consequence of Snell's Law and the extremely low speed, electromagnetic waves always enter good conductors in a direction that is within a milliradian of normal to the surface, regardless of the angle of incidence.

=== Electromagnetic waves in circuits ===
In the theoretical investigation of electric circuits, the velocity of propagation of the electromagnetic field through space is usually not considered; the field is assumed, as a precondition, to be present throughout space. The magnetic component of the field is considered to be in phase with the current, and the electric component is considered to be in phase with the voltage. The electric field starts at the conductor, and propagates through space at the speed of light, which depends on the material it is traveling through.

The electromagnetic fields do not move through space. It is the electromagnetic energy that moves. The corresponding fields simply grow and decline in a region of space in response to the flow of energy. At any point in space, the electric field corresponds not to the condition of the electric energy flow at that moment, but to that of the flow at a moment earlier. The latency is determined by the time required for the field to propagate from the conductor to the point under consideration. In other words, the greater the distance from the conductor, the more the electric field lags.

Since the velocity of propagation is very high – about 300,000 kilometers per second – the wave of an alternating or oscillating current, even of high frequency, is of considerable length. At 60 cycles per second, the wavelength is 5,000 kilometers, and even at 100,000 hertz, the wavelength is 3 kilometers. This is a very large distance compared to those typically used in field measurement and application.

The important part of the electric field of a conductor extends to the return conductor, which usually is only a few feet distant. At greater distance, the aggregate field can be approximated by the differential field between conductor and return conductor, which tends to cancel. Hence, the intensity of the electric field is usually inappreciable at a distance which is still small compared to the wavelength.

Within the range in which an appreciable field exists, this field is practically in phase with the flow of energy in the conductor. That is, the velocity of propagation has no appreciable effect unless the return conductor is very distant, or entirely absent, or the frequency is so high that the distance to the return conductor is an appreciable portion of the wavelength.

== See also ==
- Group velocity
- Reflections of signals on conducting lines
- Speed of gravity
- Speed of sound
- Velocity factor
