= Velocity factor =

Measure of electromagnetic transmission

The velocity factor (VF) of a transmission medium is the ratio of the speed at which a wavefront (of an electromagnetic signal, a radio signal, a light pulse in an optical fibre or a change of the electrical voltage on a copper wire) passes through the medium, to the speed of light in vacuum. For optical signals, the velocity factor is the reciprocal of the refractive index.

The speed of radio waves in vacuum, for example, is the speed of light, and so the velocity factor of a radio wave in vacuum is 1.0 (unity). In air, the velocity factor is ~0.9997. In electrical cables, the velocity factor mainly depends on the insulating material (see table below).

In the computer networking and cable industries, the terms velocity of propagation (VoP or $v_\mathrm{P}$) and wave propagation speed is also used to mean a ratio of speeds. In a general science and engineering context, these terms would be understood to mean an actual speed or velocity, with dimension of distance per time (and units such as metres per second), while velocity factor is used for the ratio.

== Typical velocity factors ==
Velocity factor is an important characteristic of communication media such as category 5 cables and radio transmission lines. Plenum data cable typically has a VF between 0.42 and 0.72 (42% to 72% of the speed of light in vacuum) and riser cable around 0.70 (approximately 210,000,000 m/s or 4.76 ns per metre).

Minimum velocity factors allowed for network cable standards
VF (%)	Cable type	Ethernet physical layer
74~79%	Cat-7 twisted pair	
77%	RG-8/U	Minimum for 10BASE5
67%	Optical fiber (silica glass)	Minimum for 10BASE-FL, 100BASE-FX, ...
67%	Plastic optical fiber (PMMA)	1000BASE-RHx
63%	Plastic optical fiber (polystyrene)	1000BASE-RHx
65%	RG-58A/U	Minimum for 10BASE2
65%	Cat-6A twisted pair	10GBASE-T
64%	Cat-5e twisted pair	100BASE-TX, 1000BASE-T
58.5%	Cat-3 twisted pair	Minimum for 10BASE-T

Some typical velocity factors for radio communications cables provided in handbooks and texts are given in the following table:

VF (%)	Transmission line	Center insulation
95~99%	open-wire line ("ladder line")	air insulated
93%	HJ8-50B 3 inch Heliax coaxial cable	air dielectric
86%	RG-8 Belden 7810A coaxial cable	gas-injected foamed high-density polyethylene
83%	RG-6 Belden 1189A coaxial cable, RG-11 Belden 1523A coaxial cable	
82%	RG-8X Belden 9258 coaxial cable	foamed polyethylene dielectric
80%	Belden 9085 twin-lead	
77%	RG-8/U generic	foamed polyethylene
66%	Belden 8723 twin shielded stranded twisted pair	polypropylene insulator
66%	RG-213 CXP213	solid polyethylene dielectric

== Calculating velocity factor ==
=== Electric wave ===
VF equals the reciprocal of the square root of the dielectric constant (relative permittivity), $\kappa$ or $\epsilon_\mathrm{r}$, of the material through which the signal passes:

$$\mathrm{VF} = { \frac{1}{\sqrt{\kappa}} } \$$

in the usual case where the relative permeability, $\mu_\mathrm{r}$, is 1. In the most general case:

$$\mathrm{VF} = { \frac{1}{\sqrt{\mu_\mathrm{r}\epsilon_\mathrm{r}}} } \$$

which includes unusual magnetic conducting materials, such as ferrite.

The velocity factor for a lossless transmission line is given by:

$$\mathrm{VF} = { \frac{1}{c_\mathrm{0}\sqrt{L'C'}} } \$$

where $L'$ is the lineic inductance (inductance per length, in henries per metre), $C'$ is the lineic capacitance (capacitance per unit length) between the two conductors (capacitance per length, in farads per metre), and $c_\mathrm{0}$ is the speed of light in vacuum.

=== Optical wave ===
VF equals the reciprocal of the refractive index ${n}$ of the medium, usually optical fiber.

$$\mathrm{VF} = { \frac{1}{n} } \$$

== See also ==
- Coaxial cable
- Propagation delay
- Signal velocity
- Speed of electricity
- Speed of sound
- Telegrapher's equations
