= Optical chopper =

Revolving disk with cut-outs to modulate light

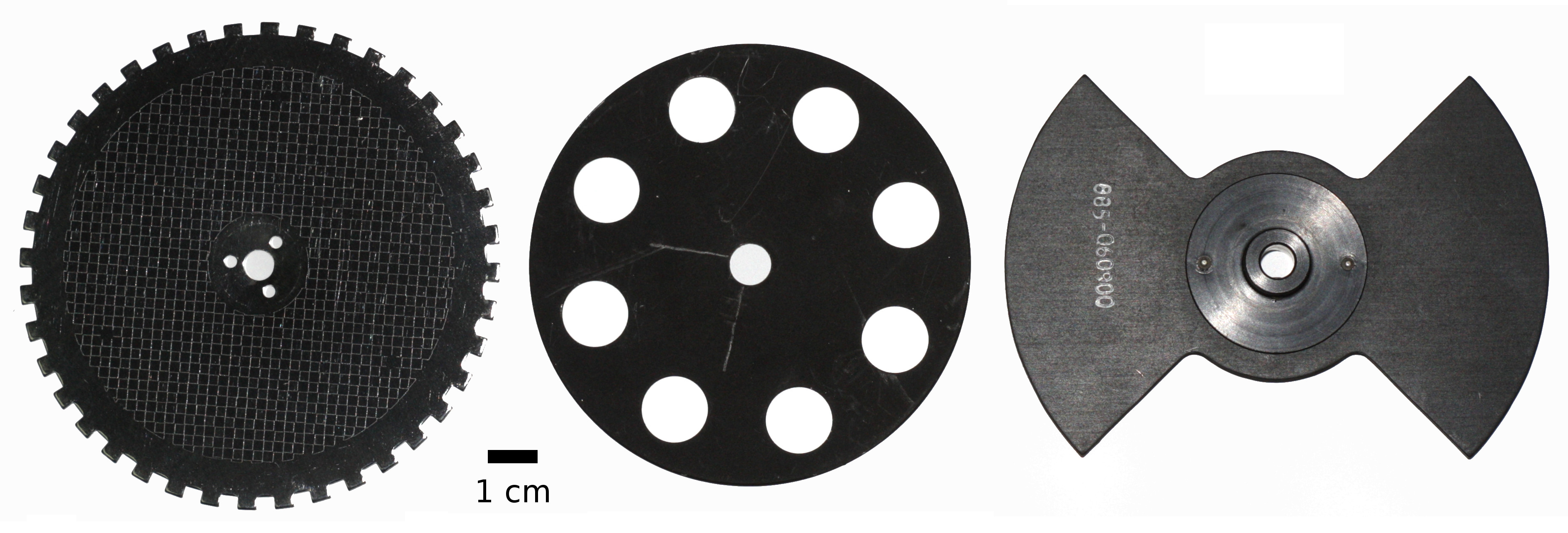
An assortment of chopper wheels

An optical chopper is a device which periodically interrupts a light beam. Three types are available: variable frequency rotating disc choppers, fixed frequency tuning fork choppers, and optical shutters. A rotating disc chopper was famously used in 1849 by Hippolyte Fizeau in the first non-astronomical measurement of the speed of light.

== Use in science laboratories ==
Typical experimental setup

Optical choppers, usually rotating disc mechanical shutters, are widely used in science labs in combination with lock-in amplifiers. The chopper is used to modulate the intensity of a light beam, and a lock-in amplifier is used to improve the signal-to-noise ratio.

To be effective, an optical chopper should have a stable rotating speed. In cases where the 1/f noise is the main problem, one would like to select the maximum chopping frequency possible. This is limited by the motor speed and the number of slots in the rotating disc, which is, in turn, limited by the disc radius and the beam diameter.

== Use in guidance systems ==
Choppers were widely used in early missile guidance systems, and in this role are sometimes known as "reticle seekers". The earliest uses were on air-to-air missiles. A photocell sensitive to infrared light is positioned behind a chopper driven by a synchronous motor. As the chopper rotates, it periodically blocks the photocell's view of the target aircraft, creating a series of pulses of output. This signal is then smoothed to make a sinusoidal output which is then compared to the signal driving the motor. The difference in phase between these two signals reveals the angle of the target compared to a given point in the motor signal. Sampling the signal at two different points directly produces X and Y error signals that can drive the missile's flight controls.

The same basic system has been used in a number of other roles. Early ICBMs used a similar chopper system connected to a small visible-light telescope to produce a star tracker that was used to improve accuracy by measuring the angles to one or more stars once they climbed above the atmosphere. Anti-tank missiles used an infrared photocell on the launcher that tracked a flare on the missile, using the X and Y error signals to drive the missile into the line of sight of the operator's aiming telescope.

These systems are no longer in use in modern weapons, as they have generally been replaced by imaging systems that provide much more information.

== Examples ==
Optical incremental rotary encoders are a form of choppers. These are used in many industrial machines. Some early anti-lock braking systems used rotary encoders for wheel speed sensors. Late 20th century opto-mechanical computer mice used two encoders for X-Y position measurement. Optical linear encoders also exist.

LCD televisions use millions of LCD shutters paired with red, green or blue filters to control the color of the pixels on the screen.

Movie cameras use an optical shutter to record individual frames of the movie. Movie projectors use an optical shutter synchronized with the movie frames to produce the effect of apparent motion on the movie screen.

Liquid crystal shutter glasses are used in conjunction with a synchronized display screen to create the illusion of a three-dimensional image.

Light signals are sent at sea and at airports using a signal lamp with a hand-operated shutter.

Examples of optical choppers in use
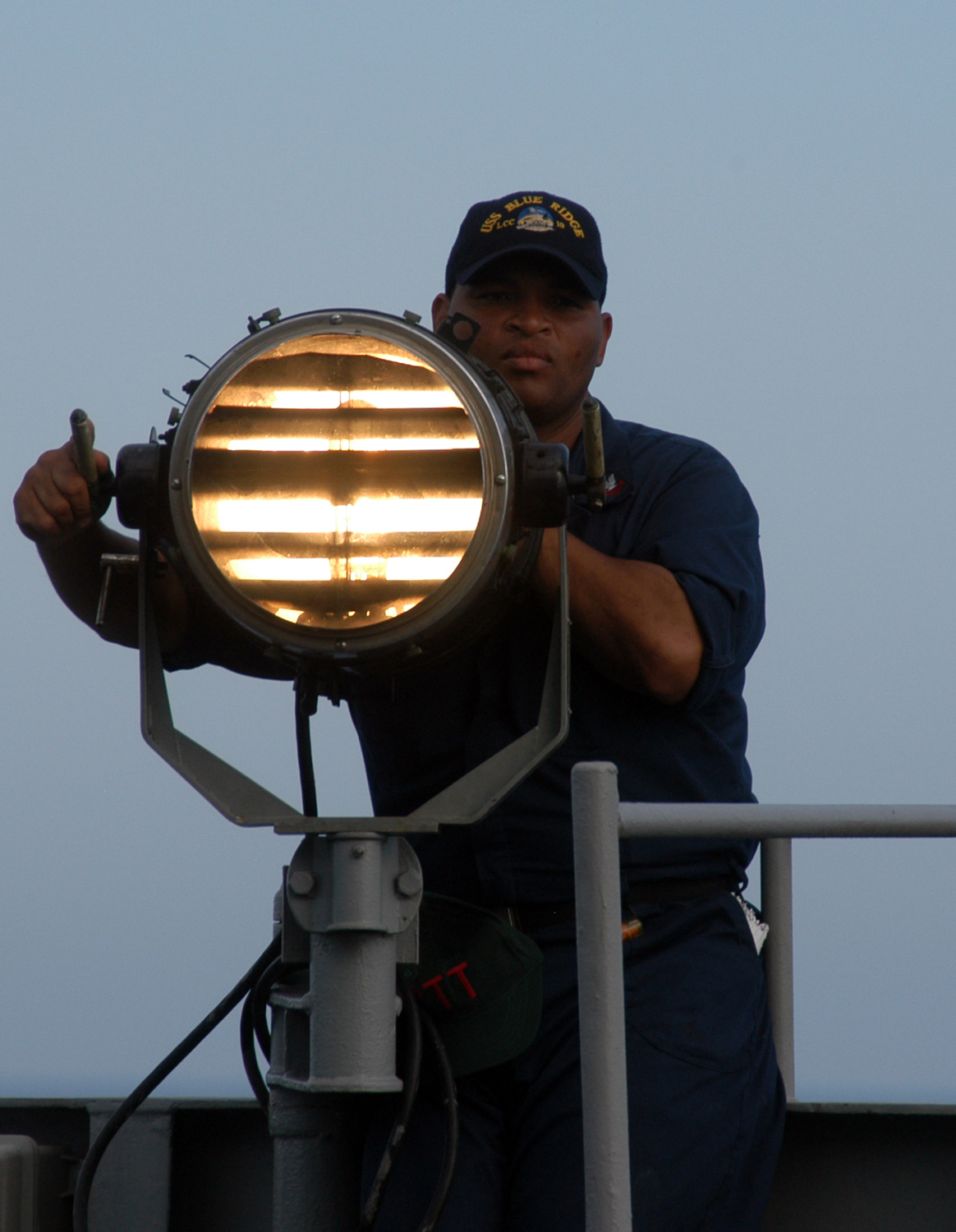
US Navy sailor sending Morse code using a signal lamp.

An opto-mechanical mouse: 1) moving the mouse turns the ball 2) X and Y rollers grip the ball and transfer movement, 3) Optical encoding disks include light holes, 4) Infrared LEDs shine through the disks 5) Sensors gather light pulses to convert to X and Y vectors.

== See also ==
- Stroboscope
- Nipkow disk
