= Drift velocity =

Average velocity of particles mainly moving randomly

In physics, drift velocity is the average velocity attained by charged particles, such as electrons, in a material due to an electric field. In general, an electron in a conductor will propagate randomly at the Fermi velocity, resulting in an average velocity of zero. Applying an electric field adds to this random motion a small net flow in one direction; this is the drift.

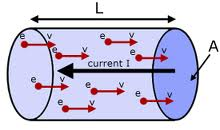
Drift velocity of electrons

Drift velocity is proportional to current. In a resistive material, it is also proportional to the magnitude of an external electric field. Thus Ohm's law can be explained in terms of drift velocity. The law's most elementary expression is:

$$u= \mu E ,$$

where u is drift velocity, μ is the material's electron mobility, and E is the electric field. In the MKS system, drift velocity has units of m/s, electron mobility, m^{2}/(V·s), and electric field, V/m.

When a potential difference is applied across a conductor, free electrons gain velocity in the direction, opposite to the electric field between successive collisions (and lose velocity when traveling in the direction of the field), thus acquiring a velocity component in that direction in addition to its random thermal velocity. As a result, there is a definite small drift velocity of electrons, which is superimposed on the random motion of free electrons. Due to this drift velocity, there is a net flow of electrons opposite to the direction of the field. The drift speed of electrons is generally in the order of 10^{−3} meters per second whereas the thermal speed is on the order of 10^{6} meters per second.

== Experimental measure ==
The formula for evaluating the drift velocity of charge carriers in a material of constant cross-sectional area is given by:

$$u = {j \over n q} ,$$

where u is the drift velocity of electrons, j is the current density flowing through the material, n is the charge-carrier number density, and q is the charge on the charge-carrier.

This can also be written as:

$$j = nqu$$

But the current density and drift velocity, j and u, are in fact vectors, so this relationship is often written as:

$$\mathbf{J} = \rho \mathbf{u} \,$$

where

$$\rho = nq$$

is the charge density (SI unit: coulombs per cubic metre).

In terms of the basic properties of the right-cylindrical current-carrying metallic ohmic conductor, where the charge-carriers are electrons, this expression can be rewritten as:

$$u = {m \; \sigma \Delta V \over \rho e f \ell} ,$$

where

- u is again the drift velocity of the electrons, in m⋅s^{−1}
- m is the molecular mass of the metal, in kg
- σ is the electric conductivity of the medium at the temperature considered, in S/m.
- ΔV is the voltage applied across the conductor, in V
- ρ is the density (mass per unit volume) of the conductor, in kg⋅m^{−3}
- e is the elementary charge, in C
- f is the number of free electrons per atom
- ℓ is the length of the conductor, in m

== Numerical example ==
Electricity is most commonly conducted through copper wires. Copper has a density of 8.94 g/cm^{3} and an atomic weight of 63.546 g/mol, so there are 140685.5 mol/m^{3}. In one mole of any element, there are 6.022×10^{23} atoms (the Avogadro number). Therefore, in 1 m^{3} of copper, there are about 8.5×10^{28} atoms (6.022×10^{23} × 140685.5 mol/m^{3}). Copper has one free electron per atom, so n is equal to 8.5×10^{28} electrons per cubic metre.

Assume a current I = 1 ampere, and a wire of 2 mm diameter (radius = 0.001 m). This wire has a cross sectional area A of π × (0.001 m)^{2} = 3.14×10^{−6} m^{2} = 3.14 mm^{2}. The elementary charge of an electron is e = −1.6×10^{−19} C. The drift velocity therefore can be calculated:
$$\begin{align}
u &= {I \over nAe}\\
&= \frac{1 \text{C}/\text{s}}{\left(8.5 \times 10^{28} \text{m}^{-3}\right) \left(3.14 \times 10^{-6} \text{m}^2\right) \left(1.6 \times 10^{-19} \text{C}\right)}\\
&= 2.3 \times 10^{-5} \text{m}/\text{s}
\end{align}$$

Dimensional analysis:
$$[u] = \dfrac{\text{A}}{\dfrac{\text{electron}}{\text{m}^3}{\cdot}\text{m}^2\cdot\dfrac{\text{C}}{\text{electron}}}
= \dfrac{\dfrac{\text{C}}{\text{s}}}{\dfrac{1}{\text{m}}{\cdot}\text{C}}
= \dfrac{\text{m}}{\text{s}}$$

Therefore, in this wire, the electrons are flowing at the rate of 23 μm/s. At 60 Hz alternating current, this means that, within half a cycle (1/120th sec.), on average the electrons drift less than 0.2 μm. In context, at one ampere around 3×10^{16} electrons will flow across the contact point twice per cycle. But out of around 1×10^{22} movable electrons per meter of wire, this is an insignificant fraction.

By comparison, the Fermi flow velocity of these electrons (which, at room temperature, can be thought of as their approximate velocity in the absence of electric current) is around 1570 km/s.

== See also ==
- Flow velocity
- Electron mobility
- Speed of electricity
- Drift chamber
- Guiding center
