= Rømer's determination of the speed of light =

1676 demonstration of light's finite speed by Danish astronomer Ole Rømer

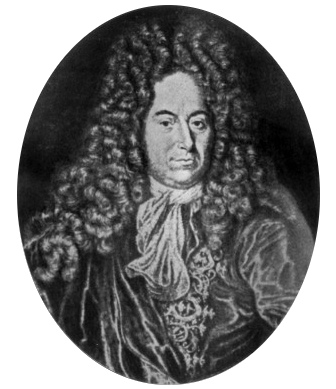
Ole Rømer (1644–1710) became a government official in his native Denmark after his discovery of the speed of light (1676). The engraving is probably posthumous.

In 1676, the Danish astronomer Ole Rømer (Note: There are several alternative spellings of Rømer's surname, including "Roemer", "Rœmer", and "Römer". The Danish "Ole" is sometimes latinized to "Olaus".) demonstrated that light has a measurable speed and so does not travel instantaneously. Rømer was working at the Royal Observatory in Paris at the time.

By timing the eclipses of Jupiter's moon Io, Rømer estimated that light would take about 22 minutes to travel a distance equal to the diameter of Earth's orbit around the Sun. Using modern orbits, this would imply a speed of light of 226,663 kilometres per second, 24.4% lower than the true value of 299,792 km/s. In his calculations Rømer used the idea and observations that the apparent time between eclipses would be greater while the Earth is moving further from Jupiter and lesser while moving closer.

Rømer's theory was controversial at the time that he announced it and he never convinced the director of the Paris Observatory, Giovanni Domenico Cassini, to fully accept it. However, it quickly gained support among other natural philosophers of the period such as Christiaan Huygens and Isaac Newton. It was finally confirmed nearly two decades after Rømer's death, with the explanation in 1729 of stellar aberration by the English astronomer James Bradley.

== Background ==
The determination of east–west positioning (longitude) was a significant practical problem in cartography and navigation before the 1700s. In 1598 Philip III of Spain had offered a prize for a method to determine the longitude of a ship out of sight of land. Galileo proposed a method of establishing the time of day, and thus longitude, based on the times of the eclipses of the moons of Jupiter, in essence using the Jovian system as a cosmic clock; this method was not significantly improved until accurate mechanical clocks were developed in the eighteenth century. Galileo proposed this method to the Spanish crown in 1616–1617 but it proved to be impractical, not least because of the difficulty of observing the eclipses from a ship. However, with refinements the method could be made to work on land.

The Italian astronomer Giovanni Domenico Cassini had pioneered the use of the eclipses of the Galilean moons for longitude measurements, and published tables predicting when eclipses would be visible from a given location. He was invited to France by Louis XIV to set up the Royal Observatory, which opened in 1671 with Cassini as director, a post he would hold for the rest of his life.

One of Cassini's first projects at his new post in Paris was to send Frenchman Jean Picard to the site of Tycho Brahe's old observatory at Uraniborg, on the island of Hven near Copenhagen. Picard was to observe and time the eclipses of Jupiter's moons from Uraniborg while Cassini recorded the times they were seen in Paris. If Picard recorded the end of an eclipse at 9 hours 43 minutes 54 seconds after midday in Uraniborg, while Cassini recorded the end of the same eclipse at 9 hours 1 minute 44 seconds after midday in Paris – a difference of 42 minutes 10 seconds – the difference in longitude could be calculated to be 10° 32' 30". (Note: The timing of the end of the eclipse comes from one of the few surviving manuscripts of Rømer, in which he records the date as 19 March 1671: see Meyer (1915). By consistency with the other timings recorded in the manuscript (written several years after the event), it has been assumed that Rømer noted the Paris time of the eclipse's end. The time difference of 42 minutes and 10 seconds between Paris and Uraniborg comes from the same manuscript: the value accepted today is 41 minutes 26 seconds.) Picard was helped in his observations by a young Dane who had recently completed his studies at the University of Copenhagen – Ole Rømer – and he must have been impressed by his assistant's skills, as he arranged for the young man to come to Paris to work at the Royal Observatory there.

== Eclipses of Io ==
Measurement of the speed of light from the time it takes Io to orbit Jupiter, using eclipses of Io by Jupiter's shadow to precisely measure its orbit.

Io is the innermost of the four moons of Jupiter discovered by Galileo in January 1610. Rømer and Cassini referred to it as the "first satellite of Jupiter". It orbits Jupiter once every 42½ hours, and the plane of its orbit is very close to the plane of Jupiter's orbit around the sun. This means that it passes some of each orbit in the shadow of Jupiter – an eclipse.

Viewed from the Earth, an eclipse of Io is seen in one of two ways.

- Io suddenly disappears, as it moves into the shadow of Jupiter. This is termed an immersion.
- Io suddenly reappears, as it moves out of the shadow of Jupiter. This is termed an emergence.

From the Earth, the immersion and the emergence cannot be observed for the same eclipse of Io, because one or the other will be hidden (occulted) by Jupiter itself. At the point of opposition (point H in the diagram below), both the immersion and the emergence would be hidden by Jupiter.

For about four months before the opposition (from F to G), immersions of Io into Jupiter's shadow can be observed, and about four months after the opposition of Jupiter (from L to K in the diagram below), emergences of Io from its eclipses can be observed. For about five or six months of the year, around the point of conjunction, eclipses of Io cannot be observed at all, because the view of Jupiter is too close to the sun. Even during the periods before and after opposition, many eclipses of Io cannot be observed from a given location on the Earth's surface: some will occur during the daytime and some will occur while Jupiter is below the horizon (hidden by the Earth itself).

The key phenomenon that Rømer observed was that the time between eclipses was not constant, but varied slightly over the year. He was fairly confident that the orbital period of Io was not actually changing, so he deduced that change was a consequence of changes in the distance between Earth and Jupiter. The orbital paths of Earth and Jupiter were available to him, and by referring to them he noticed that during periods in which Earth and Jupiter were moving away from each other the interval between eclipses always increased, whereas when Earth and Jupiter were moving toward each other, the interval between eclipses decreased. Rømer reasoned that these observations could be explained by a constant speed of light, which he calculated.

== Observations ==
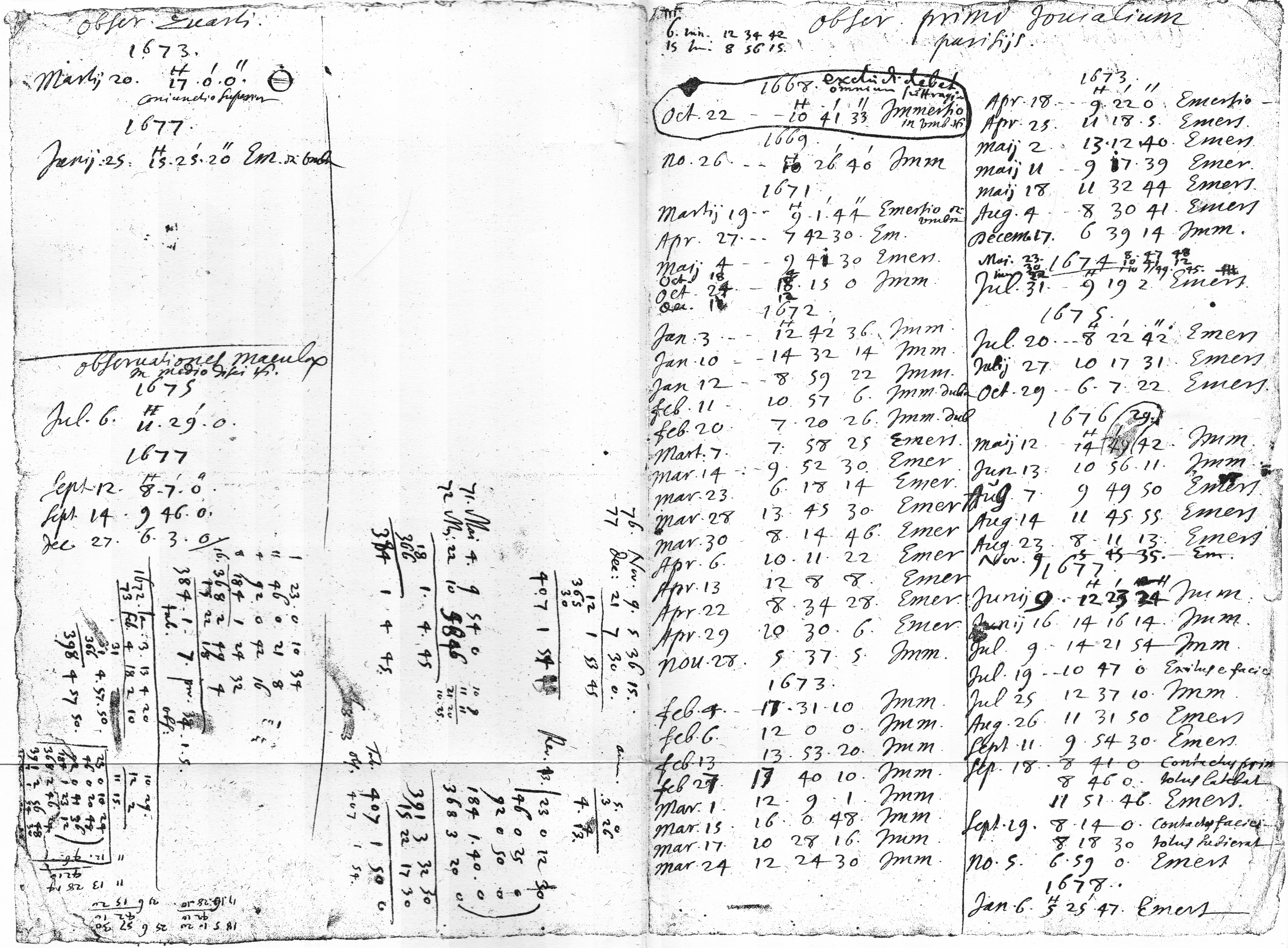
Rømer's aide-mémoire, written at some point after January 1678 and rediscovered in 1913. The timings of eclipses of Io appear on the right-hand side of this image, which would have been "page one" of the folded sheet. Click on image for an enlarged view.

Most of Rømer's papers were destroyed in the Copenhagen Fire of 1728, but one manuscript that survived contains a listing of about sixty observations of eclipses of Io from 1668 to 1678. In particular, it details two series of observations on either side of the oppositions of 2 March 1672 and 2 April 1673. Rømer comments in a letter to Christiaan Huygens dated 30 September 1677 that these observations from 1671 to 1673 form the basis for his calculations.

The surviving manuscript was written some time after January 1678, the date of the last recorded astronomical observation (an emergence of Io on 6 January), and so was later than Rømer's letter to Huygens. Rømer appears to have been collecting data on eclipses of the Galilean moons in the form of an aide-mémoire, possibly as he was preparing to return to Denmark in 1681. The document also records the observations around the opposition of 8 July 1676 that formed the basis for the announcement of Rømer's results.

== Initial announcement ==
On 22 August 1676, (Note: Several texts erroneously place the date of the announcement in 1685 or even in 1684. Bobis and Lequeux (2008) have convincingly demonstrated that the announcement was made on 22 August 1676, and that it was made by Cassini and not Rømer.) Cassini made an announcement to the Royal Academy of Sciences in Paris that he would be changing the basis of calculation for his tables of eclipses of Io. He may also have stated the reason: (Note: The original record of the meeting of the Royal Academy of Sciences has been lost. The quotation comes from an unpublished manuscript in Latin preserved in the library of the Paris Observatory, probably written by Joseph-Nicolas Delisle (1688–1768) at some point before 1738. See Bobis and Lequeux (2008), which contains a facsimile of the manuscript.)

This second inequality appears to be due to light taking some time to reach us from the satellite; light seems to take about ten to eleven minutes [to cross] a distance equal to the half-diameter of the terrestrial orbit.

Most importantly, Rømer announced the prediction that the emergence of Io on 16 November 1676 would be observed about ten minutes later than would have been calculated by the previous method. There is no record of any observation of an emergence of Io on 16 November, but an emergence was observed on 9 November. With this experimental evidence in hand, Rømer explained his new method of calculation to the Royal Academy of Sciences on 21 November.

The original record of the meeting of the Royal Academy of Sciences has been lost, but Rømer's presentation was recorded as a news report in the Journal des sçavans on 7 December. This anonymous report was translated into English and published in Philosophical Transactions of the Royal Society in London on 25 July 1677. (Note: Bobis and Lequeux (2008) tentatively attribute the translation to Edmond Halley (1656–1742), who would become English Astronomer Royal and who is best known for his calculations concerning Halley's Comet. However, other sources – not least his own Catalogus Stellarum Australium published in 1679 – suggest that Halley was on the island of St. Helena in the South Atlantic Ocean at the time.)

== Rømer's reasoning ==
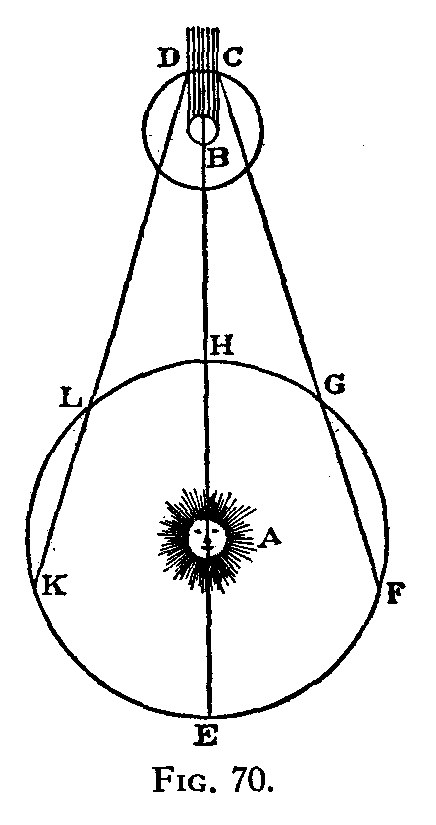
A redrawn version of the illustration from the 1676 news report. Rømer compared the apparent duration of Io's orbits as Earth moved towards Jupiter (F to G) and as Earth moved away from Jupiter (L to K).

=== Order of magnitude ===
Rømer starts with an order of magnitude demonstration that the speed of light must be so great that it takes much less than one second to travel a distance equal to Earth's diameter.

The point L on the diagram represents the second quadrature of Jupiter, when the angle between Jupiter and the Sun (as seen from Earth) is 90°. (Note: Although the news report doesn't make it explicit, the choice of a point of quadrature for the example is unlikely to be fortuitous. At the second quadrature, the motion of the Earth in its orbit is taking it directly away from Jupiter. As such, it is the point at which the greatest effect is expected over a single orbit of Io.) Rømer assumes that an observer could see an emergence of Io at the second quadrature (L), and the emergence which occurs after one orbit of Io around Jupiter (when the Earth is taken to be at point K, the diagram not being to scale), that is 42½ hours later. During those 42½ hours, the Earth has moved farther away from Jupiter by the distance LK: this, according to Rømer, is 210 times the Earth's diameter. (Note: The figure of 210 Earth-diameters per orbit of Io for the orbital speed of the Earth relative to Jupiter is far lower than the real figure, which averages around 322 Earth-diameters per orbit of Io taking into account the orbital motion of Jupiter. Rømer appears to have believed that Jupiter is closer to the Sun (and hence moving faster along its orbit) than is really the case.) If light travelled at a speed of one Earth-diameter per second, it would take 3½ minutes to travel the distance LK. And if the period of Io's orbit around Jupiter were taken as the time difference between the emergence at L and the emergence at K, the value would be 3½ minutes longer than the true value.

Rømer then applies the same logic to observations around the first quadrature (point G), when Earth is moving towards Jupiter. The time difference between an immersion seen from point F and the next immersion seen from point G should be 3½ minutes shorter than the true orbital period of Io. Hence, there should be a difference of about 7 minutes between the periods of Io measured at the first quadrature and those measured at the second quadrature. In practice, no difference is observed, from which Rømer concludes that the speed of light must be very much greater than one Earth-diameter per second.

=== Cumulative effect ===
Rømer realised that any effect of the finite speed of light would add up over a long series of observations, and it is this cumulative effect that he announced to the Royal Academy of Sciences in Paris. The effect can be illustrated with Rømer's observations from spring 1672.

Jupiter was in opposition on 2 March 1672: the first observations of emergences were on 7 March (at 07:58:25) and 14 March (at 09:52:30). Between the two observations, Io had completed four orbits of Jupiter, giving an orbital period of 42 hours 28 minutes 31¼ seconds.

The last emergence observed in the series was on 29 April (at 10:30:06). By this time, Io had completed thirty orbits around Jupiter since 7 March: the apparent orbital period is 42 hours 29 minutes 3 seconds. The difference seems tiny – 32 seconds – but it meant that the emergence on 29 April was occurring a quarter-hour after it would have been predicted. The only alternative explanation was that the observations on 7 and 14 March were wrong by two minutes.

=== Prediction ===
Rømer never published the formal description of his method, possibly because of the opposition of Cassini and Picard to his ideas (see below). (Note: The Royal Academy of Sciences had instructed Rømer to publish a joint paper with his colleagues.) However, the general nature of his calculation can be inferred from the news report in the Journal des sçavans and from Cassini's announcement on 22 August 1676.

Cassini announced that the new tables would

contain the inequality of the days or the true motion of the Sun [i.e., the inequality due to the eccentricity of the Earth's orbit], the eccentric motion of Jupiter [i.e., the inequality due to the eccentricity of the orbit of Jupiter] and this new, not previously detected, inequality [i.e., due to the finite speed of light].

Hence Cassini and Rømer appear to have been calculating the times of each eclipse based on the approximation of circular orbits, and then applying three successive corrections to estimate the time that the eclipse would be observed in Paris.

The three "inequalities" (or irregularities) listed by Cassini were not the only ones known, but they were the ones that could be corrected for by calculation. The orbit of Io is also slightly irregular because of orbital resonance with Europa and Ganymede, two of the other Galilean moons of Jupiter, but this would not be fully explained for another century. The only solution available to Cassini and to other astronomers of his time was to issue periodic corrections to the tables of eclipses of Io to take account of its irregular orbital motion: periodically resetting the clock, as it were. The obvious time to reset the clock was just after the opposition of Jupiter to the Sun, when Jupiter is at its closest to Earth and so most easily observable.

The opposition of Jupiter to the Sun occurred on or around 8 July 1676. Rømer's aide-mémoire lists two observation of emergences of Io after this opposition but before Cassini's announcement: on 7 August at 09:44:50 and on 14 August at 11:45:55. With these data, and knowing the orbital period of Io, Cassini could calculate the times of each of the eclipses over the next four to five months.

The next step in applying Rømer's correction is to calculate the position of Earth and Jupiter in their orbits for each of the eclipses. This sort of coordinate transformation was commonplace in preparing tables of positions of the planets for both astronomy and astrology: it is equivalent to finding each of the positions L (or K) for the various eclipses which might be observable.

Finally, the distance between Earth and Jupiter can be calculated using standard trigonometry, in particular the law of cosines, knowing two sides (distance between the Sun and Earth; distance between the Sun and Jupiter) and one angle (the angle between Jupiter and Earth as formed at the Sun) of a triangle. The distance from the Sun to Earth was not well known at the time, but taking it as a fixed value a, the distance from the Sun to Jupiter can be calculated as some multiple of a.

This model left just one adjustable parameter – the time taken for light to travel a distance equal to a, the radius of Earth's orbit. Rømer had about thirty observations of eclipses of Io from 1671 to 1673 that he used to find the value which fitted best: eleven minutes. With that value, he could calculate the extra time it would take light to reach Earth from Jupiter in November 1676 compared to August 1676: about ten minutes.

== Initial reactions ==
Rømer's explanation of the difference between predicted and observed timings of Io's eclipses was widely, but far from universally, accepted. Huygens was an early supporter, especially as it supported his ideas about refraction, and wrote to the French Controller-General of Finances Jean-Baptiste Colbert in Rømer's defence. However Cassini, Rømer's superior at the Royal Observatory, was an early and tenacious opponent of Rømer's ideas, and it seems that Picard, Rømer's mentor, shared many of Cassini's doubts.

Cassini's practical objections stimulated much debate at the Royal Academy of Sciences (with Huygens participating by letter from London). Cassini noted that the other three Galilean moons did not seem to show the same effect as seen for Io, and that there were other irregularities which could not be explained by Rømer's theory. Rømer replied that it was much more difficult to accurately observe the eclipses of the other moons, and that the unexplained effects were much smaller (for Io) than the effect of the speed of light: however, he admitted to Huygens that the unexplained "irregularities" in the other satellites were larger than the effect of the speed of light. The dispute had something of a philosophical note: Rømer claimed that he had discovered a simple solution to an important practical problem, while Cassini rejected the theory as flawed as it could not explain all the observations. (Note: This last point is put quite clearly as late as 1707 by Cassini's nephew, Giacomo Filippo Maraldi (1665–1729), who also worked at the Royal Observatory: "In order for an hypothesis to be accepted, it is not enough that it agrees with some observations, it must also be consistent with the other phenomena." Quoted in Bobis and Lequeux (2008).) Cassini was forced to include "empirical corrections" in his 1693 tables of eclipses, but never accepted the theoretical basis: indeed, he chose different correction values for the different moons of Jupiter, in direct contradiction with Rømer's theory.

Rømer's ideas received a much warmer reception in England. Although Robert Hooke (1635–1703) dismissed the supposed speed of light as so large as to be virtually instantaneous, the Astronomer Royal John Flamsteed (1646–1719) accepted Rømer's hypothesis in his ephemerides of eclipses of Io. Edmond Halley (1656–1742), a future Astronomer Royal, was an early and enthusiastic supporter. Isaac Newton (1643–1727) accepted Rømer's idea, giving a value of "seven or eight minutes" in his 1704 book Opticks for light to travel from the Sun to Earth, closer to the true value (8 minutes 19 seconds) than Rømer's initial estimate of 11 minutes. Newton notes that Rømer's observations had been confirmed by others, presumably meaning Flamsteed and Halley in Greenwich.

While it was difficult for people such as Hooke to conceive of the enormous speed of light, acceptance of Rømer's idea suffered a second handicap in that it was based on Kepler's model of the planets orbiting the Sun in elliptical orbits. While Kepler's model had widespread acceptance by the late seventeenth century, it was still considered sufficiently controversial for Newton to spend several pages discussing the observational evidence in favour of that model in his Philosophiæ Naturalis Principia Mathematica (1687).

Rømer's view that the velocity of light was finite was not fully accepted until measurements of stellar aberration were made in 1727 by James Bradley (1693–1762). Bradley, who succeeded Halley as Astronomer Royal, calculated a value of 8 minutes 13 seconds for light to travel from the Sun to Earth. Ironically, stellar aberration had first been observed by Cassini and (independently) by Picard in 1671, but neither astronomer was able to give an explanation for the phenomenon. Bradley's work laid to rest any remaining serious objections to the Keplerian model of the Solar System.

== Later measurements ==
Swedish astronomer Pehr Wilhelm Wargentin (1717–83) used Rømer's method in the preparation of his ephemerides of Jupiter's moons (1746), as did Giovanni Domenico Maraldi working in Paris. The remaining irregularities in the orbits of the Galilean moons would not be satisfactorily explained until the work of Joseph Louis Lagrange (1736–1813) and Pierre-Simon Laplace (1749–1827) on orbital resonance.

In 1809, again making use of observations of Io, but this time with the benefit of more than a century of increasingly precise observations, the astronomer Jean Baptiste Joseph Delambre (1749–1822) reported the time for light to travel from the Sun to the Earth as 8 minutes 12 seconds. Depending on the value assumed for the astronomical unit, this yields the speed of light as just a little more than 300,000 kilometres per second.

The first measurements of the speed of light using completely terrestrial apparatus were published in 1849 by Hippolyte Fizeau (1819–96). Compared to values accepted today, Fizeau's result (about 313,000 kilometres per second) was too high, and less accurate than those obtained by Rømer's method. It would be another thirty years before A. A. Michelson in the United States published his more precise results (299,910±50 km/s) and Simon Newcomb confirmed the agreement with astronomical measurements, almost exactly two centuries after Rømer's announcement.

== Later discussion ==
=== Did Rømer measure the speed of light? ===
Several discussions have suggested that Rømer should not be credited with the measurement of the speed of light, as he never gave a value in Earth-based units. These authors credit Huygens with the first calculation of the speed of light.

Huygens's estimate was a value of 110,000,000 toises per second: as the toise was later determined to be just under two metres, (Note: The exact ratio is 1 toise = 54000/27706 metres, or approximately 1.949 m: French law of 19 frimaire An VIII (10 December 1799). Huygens was using Picard's value (1669) of the circumference of the Earth as 360×25×2282 toises, while the 1799 legal conversion uses the more precise results of Delambre and Méchain.) this gives the value in SI units.

However, Huygens's estimate was not a precise calculation but rather an illustration at an order of magnitude level. The relevant passage from Traité de la lumière reads:

If one considers the vast size of the diameter KL, which according to me is some 24 thousand diameters of the Earth, one will acknowledge the extreme velocity of Light. For, supposing that KL is no more than 22 thousand of these diameters, it appears that being traversed in 22 minutes this makes the speed a thousand diameters in one minute, that is 16-2/3 diameters in one second or in one beat of the pulse, which makes more than 11 hundred times a hundred thousand toises;

Huygens was obviously not concerned about the 9% difference between his preferred value for the distance from the Sun to Earth and the one he uses in his calculation. Nor was there any doubt in Huygens's mind as to Rømer's achievement, as he wrote to Colbert:

I have seen recently, with much pleasure, the beautiful discovery of Mr. Romer, to demonstrate that light takes time in propagating, and even to measure this time;

Neither Newton nor Bradley bothered to calculate the speed of light in Earth-based units. The next recorded calculation was probably made by Fontenelle: claiming to work from Rømer's results, the historical account of Rømer's work written some time after 1707 gives a value of 48203 leagues per second. This is 16.826 Earth-diameters (214,636 km) per second.

=== Doppler method ===
It has also been suggested that Rømer was measuring a Doppler effect. The original effect discovered by Christian Doppler 166 years later refers to propagating electromagnetic waves. The generalization referred to here is the change in observed frequency of an oscillator (in this case, Io orbiting around Jupiter) when the observer (in this case, on Earth's surface) is moving: the frequency is higher when the observer is moving towards the oscillator and lower when the observer is moving away from the oscillator. This apparently anachronistic analysis implies that Rømer was measuring the ratio c/v, where c is the speed of light and v is the Earth's orbital velocity (strictly, the component of the Earth's orbital velocity parallel to the Earth–Jupiter vector), and indicates that the major inaccuracy of Rømer's calculations was his poor knowledge of the orbit of Jupiter.

Rømer's description of his method (quoted below):

"Now supposing that the Earth when at L, near the second quadrature of Jupiter, has seen the first satellite (Io) at the time of its emersion or coming out of the shadow at D; and supposing that about 42.5 hours afterwards, i.e., after a revolution of the satellite, the Earth being at K, the return path at D, it is evident that if the light takes time to cross the intervening space LK, the satellite will be seen at D later than it would have been seen if the Earth had remained at L, so that the revolution of the satellite, thus observed by means of its emersions, will be retarded by as much time as the light will have taken to pass from L to K. On the other hand, in the other quadrature FG, the Earth when approaching goes before the light, and the succession of the immersions will appear shortened by as much as those of the emersions had appeared lengthened."

indicates that he understood that he was measuring what we today call a Doppler effect. Using the Earth's orbital velocity one can calculate that the maximum rate of recession (or approach) to Jupiter by Earth in 42.5 hours is about 4.56 x 10^6 km, which takes light about 15 seconds to traverse.

There is no evidence that Rømer thought that he was measuring c/v: he gives his result as the time of 22 minutes for light to travel a distance equal to the diameter of Earth's orbit or, equivalently, 11 minutes for light to travel from the Sun to Earth. It can be readily shown that the two measurements are equivalent: if we give τ as the time taken for light to cross the radius of an orbit (e.g. from the Sun to Earth) and P as the orbital period (the time for one complete rotation), then (Note: The expression is given for the approximation to a circular orbit. The derivation is as follows: (1) express the orbital velocity in terms of the orbital radius r and the orbital period P: v = 2πr/P (2) substitute τ = r/c → v = 2πτc/P (3) rearrange to find c/v.)

$${c\over v} = {P\over{2\pi\tau}}$$

Bradley, who was measuring c/v in his studies of aberration in 1729, was well aware of this relation as he converts his results for c/v into a value for τ without any comment.

== See also ==
- Longitude rewards

== Bibliography ==
- Bobis, Laurence; Lequeux, James (2008). "Cassini, Rømer and the velocity of light". J. Astron. Hist. Herit. 11 (2): 97–105. Bibcode:2008JAHH...11...97B. doi:10.3724/SP.J.1440-2807.2008.02.02. S2CID 115455540..
- Bradley, James (1729). "Account of a new discovered Motion of the Fix'd Stars". Philosophical Transactions of the Royal Society of London. 35: 637–660. doi:10.1098/rstl.1727.0064..
- Cohen, I. B. (1940). "Roemer and the first determination of the velocity of light (1676)". Isis. 31 (2): 327–379. doi:10.1086/347594. hdl:2027/uc1.b4375710. S2CID 145428377.; reprinted in book form by the Burndy Library, 1942.
- Daukantas, Patricia (July 2009). "Ole Rømer and the Speed of Light". Optics & Photonics News. 20 (7): 42–47. doi:10.1364/OPN.20.7.000042..
- French, A. P. (1990), "Roemer: a cautionary tale", in Roche, John (ed.), Physicists look back: studies in the history of physics, CRC Press, pp. 120–123, ISBN 0-85274-001-8.
- Godin, Louis; Fontenelle, Bernard de, eds. (1729–1734), Mémoires de l'Académie royale des sciences depuis 1666 jusqu'en 1692, Paris: Compagnie des libraires, pp. 112–15, 140–141. (in French)
- Huygens, Christiaan (16 September 1677), "Lettre Nº 2103", in Bosscha, J. (ed.), Œuvres complètes de Christiaan Huygens (1888–1950). Tome VIII: Correspondance 1676–1684, The Hague: Martinus Nijhoff (published 1899), pp. 30–31. (in Latin)
- Huygens, Christiaan (14 October 1677), "Lettre Nº 2105", in Bosscha, J. (ed.), Œuvres complètes de Christiaan Huygens (1888–1950). Tome VIII: Correspondence 1676–1684, The Hague: Martinus Nijhoff (published 1899), pp. 36–37. (in French)
- Huygens, Christiaan (1690), Traitée de la Lumière, Leiden: Pierre van der Aa. (in French)
- Meyer, Kirstine (1915). "Om Ole Rømers Opdagelse af Lysets Tøven". Det Kongelige Danske Videnskabernes Selskabs Skrifter, 7. Række, Naturvidenskabelig og Mathematisk Afdeling. XII: 3.. (in Danish)
- Newton, Isaac (1704), "Book II, Prop. XI", Opticks, London: Sam. Smith. and Benj. Walford.
- Rømer, Ole (30 September 1677), "Lettre Nº 2104", in Bosscha, J. (ed.), Œuvres complètes de Christiaan Huygens (1888–1950). Tome VIII: Correspondance 1676–1684, The Hague: Martinus Nijhoff (published 1899), pp. 32–35. (in Latin)
- Saito, Yoshio (2005). "A Discussion of Roemer's Discovery concerning the Speed of Light". AAPPS Bulletin. 15 (3): 9–17..
- Shea, James H. (1998). "Ole Rømer, the speed of light, the apparent period of Io, the Doppler effect, and the dynamics of Earth and Jupiter". Am. J. Phys. 66 (7): 561–569. Bibcode:1998AmJPh..66..561S. doi:10.1119/1.19020..
- Teuber, Jan (2004), "Ole Rømer og den bevægede Jord - en dansk førsteplads?", in Friedrichsen, Per; Henningsen, Ole; Olsen, Olaf; Thykier, Claus; Tortzen, Chr. Gorm (eds.), Ole Rømer - videnskabsmand og samfundstjener, Copenhagen: Gads Forlag, p. 218, ISBN 87-12-04139-4. (in Danish)
- Wróblewski, Andrzej (1985). "de Mora Luminis: A spectacle in two acts with a prologue and an epilogue". Am. J. Phys. 53 (7): 620–630. Bibcode:1985AmJPh..53..620W. doi:10.1119/1.14270..
