= Baptistin Baille =

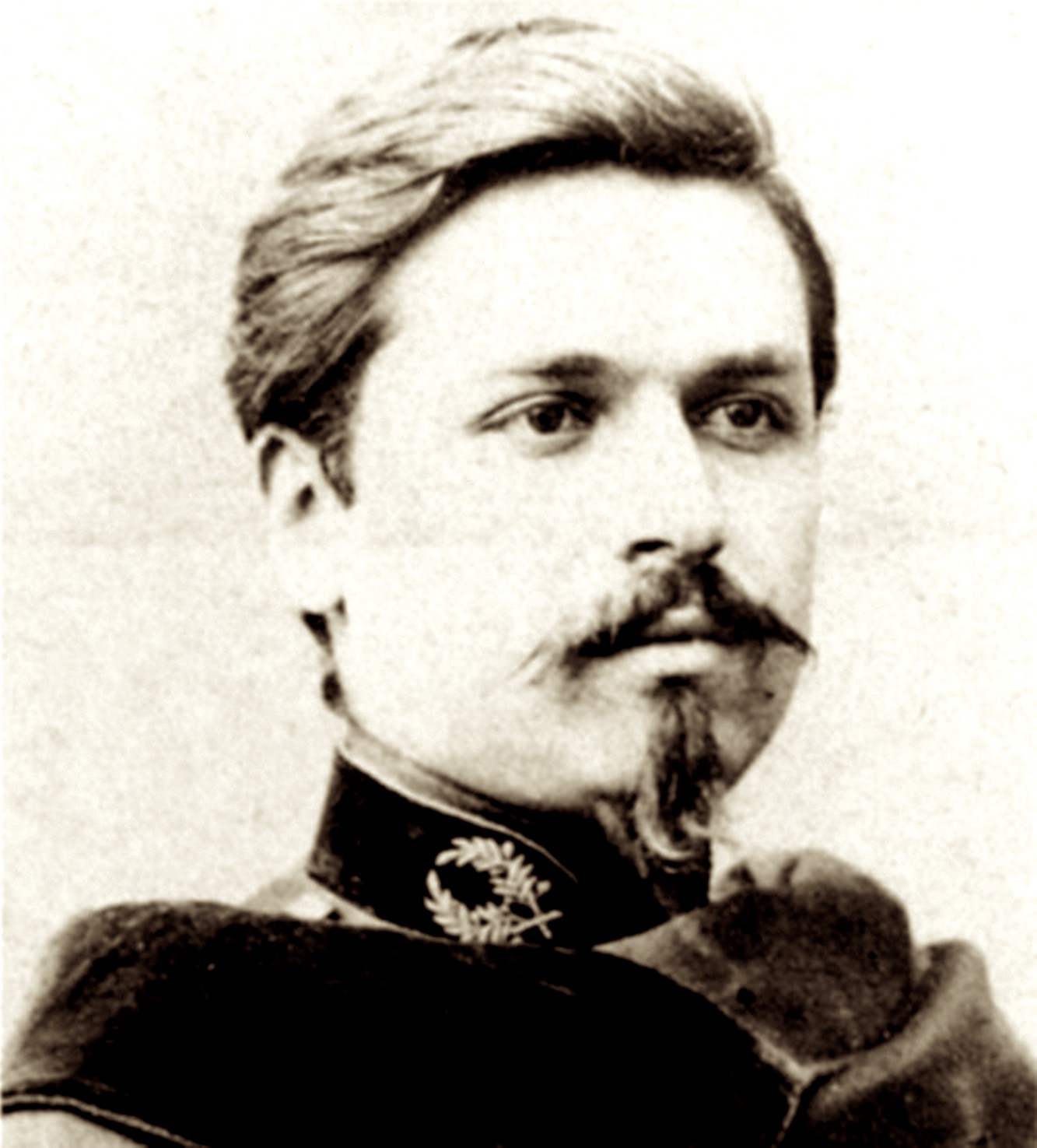
Baptistin Baille

Baptistin Baille (French pronunciation: [batistɛ̃ baj]) was born as Jean-Baptiste Baille in France, in 1841 and he died in 1918. He was initially a lecturer at École polytechnique, and then a professor of optics and acoustics at École supérieure de physique et de chimie industrielles de la ville de Paris; a close friend of Paul Cézanne, the impressionist artist, and of Émile Zola who would later become a writer.

== "Les trois inséparables" ==
Together, they were known as "les trois inséparables" (the three inseparables). The three boys met when they were at college and often swam together at the River Arc. Cézanne produced numerous paintings of male bathers based on these experiences, which Zola also remembered in his novel, L'Œuvre,

Another friend and classmate was Louis Marguery, future lawyer and writer for vaudeville.

== Sources ==
- Brown, F. 1984. "Zola and Cézanne: The early years". New Criterion 3:15–29.
