= Venteuil =

- Commune
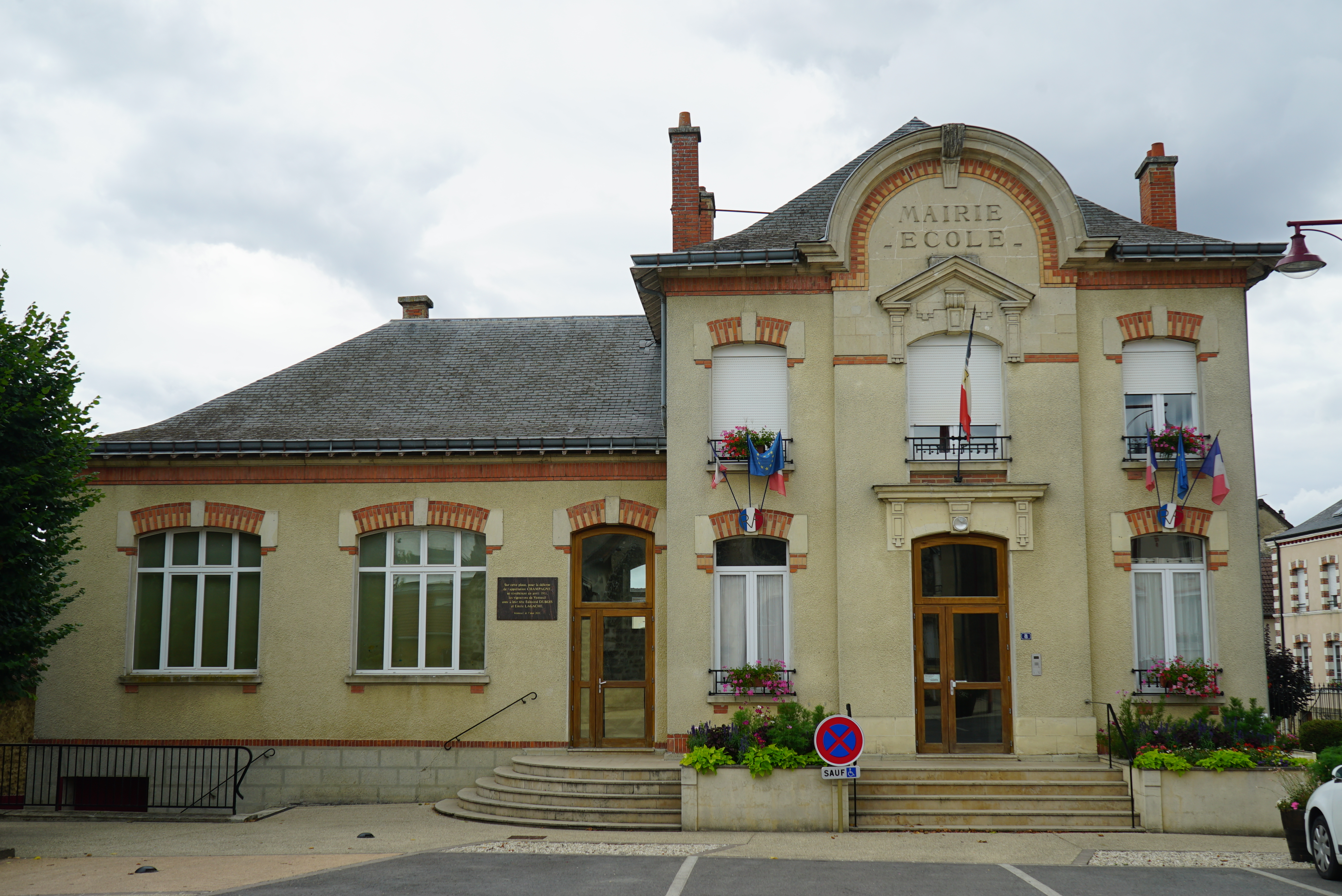
- The town hall in Venteuil

- Coat of arms
- Location of Venteuil
- Location within France Location within Grand Est
- Coordinates: 49°04′58″N 3°50′31″E
- Country: France
- Region: Grand Est
- Department: Marne
- Arrondissement: Épernay
- Canton: Dormans-Paysages de Champagne
- Intercommunality: Paysages de la Champagne

Government
  - Mayor (2020–2026): Guillaume Guerre
- Area^{1}: 6.25 km^{2} (2.41 sq mi)
- Elevation: 160 m (520 ft)
- Population (2023): 462
  - Density: 73.9/km^{2} (191/sq mi)
- Time zone: UTC+01:00 (CET)
  - Summer (DST): UTC+02:00 (CEST)
- INSEE/Postal code: 51605 /51480
- ^{1} French Land Register data, which excludes lakes, ponds, glaciers > 1 km^{2} (0.386 sq mi or 247 acres) and river estuaries.

Venteuil (French pronunciation: [vɑ̃tœj]) is a commune in the Marne department in north-eastern France.

== See also ==
- Communes of the Marne department
- Montagne de Reims Regional Natural Park
