= Speed of light =

Speed of electromagnetic waves

Speed of light in vacuum
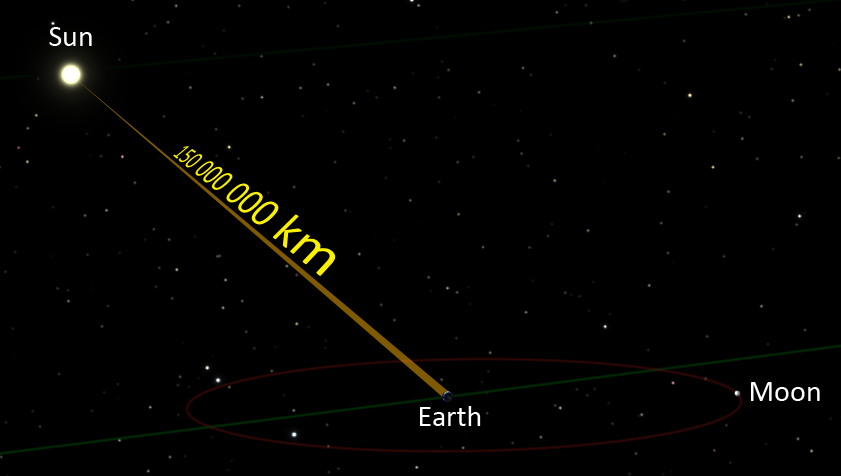
- Due to its finite speed, sunlight takes 8 minutes and 10 to 27 seconds to reach Earth, depending on the time of year.

Exact value
- metres per second: 299792458

Approximate values (to three significant digits)
- kilometres per hour: 1080000000
- miles per second: 186000
- miles per hour: 671000000
- astronomical units per day: 173 (Note: Exact value: (299792458 × 86400 / 149597870700) AU/day.)
- parsecs per year: 0.307 (Note: Exact value: (999992651 π / 10246429500) pc/y.)

Approximate light signal travel times
- Distance: Time
- one foot: 1.0 ns
- one metre: 3.3 ns
- from geostationary orbit to Earth: 119 ms
- the length of Earth's equator: 134 ms
- from Moon to Earth: 1.3 s
- from Sun to Earth (1 AU): 8.3 min
- one light-year: 1.0 year
- one parsec: 3.26 years
- from the nearest star to Sun (1.3 pc): 4.2 years
- from the nearest galaxy to Earth: 70000 years
- across the Milky Way: 87400 years
- from the Andromeda Galaxy to Earth: 2.5 million years

The speed of light is the speed of electromagnetic waves. Light travels at slower speed inside materials like glass or water; its highest speed is in a vacuum. The speed of light in vacuum is a universal physical constant denoted c (in ISO and IEC standards $c_0$), exactly equal to 299792458 m⋅s^{−1}. It is exact because, by international agreement, a metre is defined as the length of the path travelled by light in vacuum during a time interval of 1/299792458 second. The value 299,792,458 metres per second is approximately 1 billion kilometres per hour; 700 million miles per hour. For other approximations of c, valid for various units and size scales see the infobox. The shorter form, speed of light, means speed of light in vacuum in any context where the vacuum is implied.

All forms of electromagnetic radiation, including visible light, travel in vacuum at the speed c as do massless particles and field perturbations, such as gravitational waves. The speed of light in vacuum is the same for all observers, no matter their relative velocity. As a result, massless particles and waves travel at c in a vacuum regardless of the motion of the source or the inertial reference frame of the observer. The speed of light in vacuum is the upper limit for the speed at which information, matter, or energy can travel through space. Particles with nonzero rest mass can be accelerated to approach c but can never reach it, regardless of the frame of reference in which their speed is measured.

For long distances and sensitive measurements, the finite speed of light has noticeable effects. Much starlight viewed on Earth is from the distant past, allowing humans to study the history of the universe by viewing distant objects. When communicating with distant space probes, it can take hours for signals to travel. In computing, the speed of light fixes the ultimate minimum communication delay. The speed of light in vacuum can be used in time of flight measurements to measure large distances to extremely high precision.

The speed at which light propagates through transparent materials, such as glass or air, is less than c; similarly, the speed of electromagnetic waves around wire cables (the speed of electricity) is slower than c. The ratio between c and the speed v at which light travels in a material is called the refractive index n of the material (n = c/v). For example, for visible light, the refractive index of glass is typically around 1.5, meaning that light in glass travels at c/1.5 ≈ 200000 km/s (124000 mi/s); the refractive index of air for visible light is about 1.0003, so the speed of light in air is about 90 km/s (56 mi/s) slower than c.

In the context of relativity, luminal speed may be used. In some cases, objects or waves may appear to travel faster than light, also called superluminal speed. Simplistic calculations of the speed of distant galaxies due to the expansion of the universe appear to exceed the speed of light, but only local velocity can be defined uniquely. Ole Rømer first demonstrated that light does not travel instantaneously by studying the apparent motion of Jupiter's moon Io. In an 1865 paper, James Clerk Maxwell proposed that light was an electromagnetic wave and, therefore, travelled at speed c. Albert Einstein postulated that the speed of light c with respect to any inertial frame of reference is a constant and is independent of the motion of the light source. He explored the consequences of that postulate by deriving the theory of relativity, and so showed that the parameter c had relevance outside of the context of light and electromagnetism. In the theory of relativity, c interrelates space and time and appears in the famous mass–energy equivalence, E = mc^{2}.

== Notation ==
The speed of light in vacuum is usually denoted by a lowercase c. The origin of the letter choice is unclear, with guesses including "c" for "constant" or the Latin celeritas (meaning 'swiftness, celerity'). The "c" was used for "celerity" meaning a velocity in books by Leonhard Euler and others, but this velocity was not specifically for light; Isaac Asimov wrote a popular science article, "C for Celeritas", but did not explain the origin. In 1856, Wilhelm Eduard Weber and Rudolf Kohlrausch had used c for a different constant that was later shown to equal √2 times the speed of light in vacuum. Historically, the symbol V was used as an alternative symbol for the speed of light, introduced by James Clerk Maxwell in 1865. In 1903, Max Abraham used c with its modern meaning in a widely read textbook on electromagnetism. Einstein used V in his original German-language papers on special relativity in 1905, but in 1907 he switched to c, which by then had become the standard symbol for the speed of light.

Sometimes c is used for the speed of waves in any material medium, and c_{0} for the speed of light in vacuum.

== In unit systems ==
The constant c is defined in the International System of Units (SI) as exactly 299792458 m/s. This fixed value is used to define the metre as exactly the distance that light travels in vacuum in 1/299792458 of a second. The second is, in turn, defined to be the length of time occupied by 9192631770 cycles of the radiation emitted by a caesium-133 atom in a transition between two specified energy states. By using the fixed value of c and an accurate measurement of the second, the value for the standard metre is defined.

Prior to 1983, the meter was defined separately from the second and the speed of light was measured experimentally. The particular value adopted for the fixed speed of light in the current unit system was chosen to agree with the best measurements available before 1983. The current definition of the second was adopted in 1967.

As a dimensional physical constant, the numerical value of c is different for different unit systems. For example, in imperial units, the speed of light is approximately 186282 miles per second. The speed of light is less than 2% different from 1 billion feet per second or one foot per nanosecond. Naval officer and computer scientist Grace Murray Hopper distributed foot-long wires to colleagues in the late 1960s to visually illustrate the importance of designing smaller components to increase computing speed.

In branches of physics in which c appears often, such as in relativity, it is common to use systems of natural units of measurement or the geometrized unit system where c = 1. Using these units, c does not appear explicitly because multiplication or division by 1 does not affect the result. Its unit of light-second per second is still relevant, even if omitted.

== Role in physics ==
=== Boundary for effects of special relativity ===
The speed at which light waves propagate in vacuum is independent of the speed of the wave source relative to any observer. The invariance of the speed of light has been verified by experiments such as the Kennedy–Thorndike experiment and the Ives–Stilwell experiment. This invariance of c combined with the assumption that the laws of physics are the same for all interactions between objects outside of gravitational fields results in the special theory of relativity.

Special relativity has many experimentally verified but counterintuitive implications. These include the equivalence of mass and energy (E = mc^{2}), length contraction (moving objects shorten), Terrell rotation (apparent rotation), and time dilation (moving clocks run more slowly). These implications are only evident in circumstances when relative velocities approach the speed of light. Thus the speed of light acts as a boundary between those domains where non-relativistic models are adequate and those domains where relativity must be included.

The Lorentz factor γ as a function of velocity. It starts at 1 and approaches infinity as v approaches c.

One way to characterize the transition to relativistic effects is the Lorentz factor. This is the factor γ by which lengths contract and times dilate and is given by
$$\gamma=\frac1\sqrt{1-\frac{v^2}{c^2}}$$
where v is the speed of the object. The difference of γ from 1 is negligible for speeds much slower than c, such as most everyday speeds – in which case special relativity is closely approximated by Galilean relativity – but it increases at relativistic speeds and diverges to infinity as v approaches c. For example, a time dilation factor of γ = 2 occurs at a relative velocity of approximately 86.6% of the speed of light (v ≈ 0.866c). Similarly, a time dilation factor of γ = 10 occurs at approximately 99.5% the speed of light (v ≈ 0.995c).

=== Synthesis of space and time ===
The speed of light relates the units of space and time in the unified geometry called spacetime. Distances are generalized in spacetime to Lorentz intervals
$$(\Delta s)^2 = (\Delta ct)^2 - (\Delta x)^2 - (\Delta y)^2 - (\Delta z)^2.$$
where differences in space ($x, y, z$) are combined with differences in time using a factor of $c^2$ and a negative sign.

All physical theories based on spacetime satisfy a special symmetry called Lorentz invariance, whose mathematical formulation contains the parameter c. Lorentz invariance is an almost universal assumption for modern physical theories, such as quantum electrodynamics, quantum chromodynamics, the Standard Model of particle physics, and general relativity. As such, the parameter c is ubiquitous in modern physics, appearing in many contexts that are unrelated to light. For example, general relativity predicts that c is also the speed of gravity and of gravitational waves, and observations of gravitational waves have been consistent with this prediction. In non-inertial frames of reference (gravitationally curved spacetime or accelerated reference frames), the local speed of light is constant and equal to c, but the speed of light can differ from c when measured from a remote frame of reference, depending on how measurements are extrapolated to the region.

=== Mass and massless particles ===
Massless particles travel at the speed of light. The speed of light is an unattainable speed for objects with positive rest mass. An object with rest mass m and speed v relative to a laboratory has kinetic energy (γ − 1)mc^{2} with respect to that lab, where γ is the Lorentz factor defined above. The γ factor approaches infinity as v approaches c, and it would take an infinite amount of energy to accelerate an object with mass to the speed of light. Analysis of individual photons confirms that information cannot travel faster than the speed of light. This is experimentally established in many tests of relativistic energy and momentum.

=== Causality ===
Event A precedes B in the red frame, is simultaneous with B in the green frame, and follows B in the blue frame.

More generally, it is impossible for signals or energy to travel faster than c. One argument for this is known as causality. If the spatial distance between two events A and B is greater than the time interval between them multiplied by c then there are frames of reference in which A precedes B, others in which B precedes A, and others in which they are simultaneous. As a result, if something were travelling faster than c relative to an inertial frame of reference, it would be travelling backwards in time relative to another frame, and causality would be violated. In such a frame of reference, an "effect" could be observed before its "cause". Such a violation of causality has never been recorded, and would lead to paradoxes such as the tachyonic antitelephone.

In some theoretical treatments, the Scharnhorst effect allows signals to travel faster than c, by one part in 10^{36}. However other approaches to the same physical set up show no such effect. and it appears the special conditions in which this effect might occur would prevent one from using it to violate causality.

=== One-way speed of light ===
It is only possible to verify experimentally that the two-way speed of light (for example, from a source to a mirror and back again) is frame-independent, because it is impossible to measure the one-way speed of light (for example, from a source to a distant detector) without some convention as to how clocks at the source and at the detector should be synchronized. By adopting Einstein synchronization for the clocks, the one-way speed of light becomes equal to the two-way speed of light by definition.

It is generally assumed that the two-way speed of light is isotropic, meaning that it has the same value regardless of the direction in which it is measured. Observations of the emissions from nuclear energy levels as a function of the orientation of the emitting nuclei in a magnetic field, and of rotating optical resonators have put stringent limits on the possible two-way anisotropy.

=== Variable speed of light ===
It is generally assumed that fundamental constants such as c have the same value throughout spacetime, meaning that they do not depend on location and do not vary with time. However, some theories of cosmology postulate a speed of light which varies over time as an alternative way of explaining astronomical observations. The speed of light plays many roles in physics and allowing one role to change may not be consistent with its other roles. These kinds of theories remain the subject of ongoing research.

== Faster-than-light observations and experiments ==
There are situations in which it may seem that matter, energy, or information-carrying signals travel at speeds greater than c, but they do not. For example, as is discussed in the propagation of light in a medium section, many wave velocities can exceed c. The phase velocity of X-rays through most glasses can routinely exceed c, but phase velocity does not determine the velocity at which waves convey information.

If a laser beam is swept quickly across a distant object, the spot of light can move faster than c, although the initial movement of the spot is delayed because of the time it takes light to get to the distant object at the speed c. However, the only physical entities that are moving are the laser and its emitted light, which travels at the speed c from the laser to the various positions of the spot. Similarly, a shadow projected onto a distant object can be made to move faster than c, after a delay in time. In neither case does any matter, energy, or information travel faster than light.

The rate of change in the distance between two objects in a frame of reference with respect to which both are moving (their closing speed) may have a value in excess of c. However, this does not represent the speed of any single object as measured in a single inertial frame.

Certain quantum effects appear to be transmitted instantaneously and therefore faster than c, as in the EPR paradox. An example involves the quantum states of two particles that can be entangled. Until either of the particles is observed, they exist in a superposition of two quantum states. If the particles are separated and one particle's quantum state is observed, the other particle's quantum state is determined instantaneously. However, it is impossible to control which quantum state the first particle will take on when it is observed, so information cannot be transmitted in this manner.

Another quantum effect that predicts the occurrence of faster-than-light speeds is called the Hartman effect: under certain conditions the time needed for a virtual particle to tunnel through a barrier is constant, regardless of the thickness of the barrier. This could result in a virtual particle crossing a large gap faster than light. However, no information can be sent using this effect.

So-called superluminal motion is seen in certain astronomical objects, such as the relativistic jets of radio galaxies and quasars. However, these jets are not moving at speeds in excess of the speed of light: the apparent superluminal motion is a projection effect caused by objects moving near the speed of light and approaching Earth at a small angle to the line of sight: since the light which was emitted when the jet was farther away took longer to reach the Earth, the time between two successive observations corresponds to a longer time between the instants at which the light rays were emitted.

A 2011 experiment where neutrinos were observed to travel faster than light turned out to be due to experimental error.

In models of the expanding universe, the farther galaxies are from each other, the faster they drift apart. For example, galaxies far away from Earth are inferred to be moving away from the Earth with speeds proportional to their distances. Beyond a boundary called the Hubble sphere, the rate at which their distance from Earth increases becomes greater than the speed of light. These recession rates, defined as the increase in proper distance per cosmological time, are not velocities in a relativistic sense. Faster-than-light cosmological recession speeds are only a coordinate artifact.

== Propagation of light ==
In classical physics, light is described as a type of electromagnetic wave. The classical behaviour of the electromagnetic field is described by Maxwell's equations, which predict that the speed c with which electromagnetic waves (such as light) propagate in vacuum is related to the distributed capacitance and inductance of vacuum, otherwise respectively known as the electric constant ε_{0} and the magnetic constant μ_{0}, by the equation
$$c = \frac{1}{\sqrt{\varepsilon_0 \mu_0}}.$$

In modern quantum physics, the electromagnetic field is described by the theory of quantum electrodynamics (QED). In this theory, light is described by the fundamental excitations (or quanta) of the electromagnetic field, called photons. In QED, photons are massless particles and thus, according to special relativity, they travel at the speed of light in vacuum.

Extensions of QED in which the photon has a mass have been considered. In such a theory, its speed would depend on its frequency, and the invariant speed c of special relativity would then be the upper limit of the speed of light in vacuum. No variation of the speed of light with frequency has been observed in rigorous testing, putting stringent limits on the mass of the photon. The limit obtained depends on the model used: if the massive photon is described by Proca theory, the experimental upper bound for its mass is about 10^{−57} grams; if photon mass is generated by a Higgs mechanism, the experimental upper limit is less sharp, m ≤ 10^{−14} eV/c^{2} (roughly 2×10^{−47} g).

Another reason for the speed of light to vary with its frequency would be the failure of special relativity to apply to arbitrarily small scales, as predicted by some proposed theories of quantum gravity. In 2009, the observation of gamma-ray burst GRB 090510 found no evidence for a dependence of photon speed on energy, supporting tight constraints in specific models of spacetime quantization on how this speed is affected by photon energy for energies approaching the Planck scale.

=== In a medium ===
In a medium, light usually does not propagate at a speed equal to c; further, different types of light wave will travel at different speeds. The speed at which the individual crests and troughs of a plane wave (a wave filling the whole space, with only one frequency) propagate is called the phase velocity v_{p}. A physical signal with a finite extent (a pulse of light) travels at a different speed. The overall envelope of the pulse travels at the group velocity v_{g}, and its earliest part travels at the front velocity v_{f}.

The blue dot moves at the speed of the ripples, the phase velocity; the green dot moves with the speed of the envelope, the group velocity; and the red dot moves with the speed of the foremost part of the pulse, the front velocity.

The phase velocity is important in determining how a light wave travels through a material or from one material to another. It is often represented in terms of a refractive index. The refractive index of a material is defined as the ratio of c to the phase velocity v_{p} in the material: larger indices of refraction indicate lower speeds. The refractive index of a material may depend on the light's frequency, intensity, polarization, or direction of propagation; in many cases, though, it can be treated as a material-dependent constant. The refractive index of air is approximately 1.0003. Denser media, such as water, glass, and diamond, have refractive indexes of around 1.3, 1.5 and 2.4, respectively, for visible light.

In exotic materials like Bose–Einstein condensates near absolute zero, the effective speed of light may be only a few metres per second. However, this represents absorption and re-radiation delay between atoms, as do all slower-than-c speeds in material substances. As an extreme example of light "slowing" in matter, two independent teams of physicists claimed to bring light to a "complete standstill" by passing it through a Bose–Einstein condensate of the element rubidium. The popular description of light being "stopped" in these experiments refers only to light being stored in the excited states of atoms, then re-emitted at an arbitrarily later time, as stimulated by a second laser pulse. During the time it had "stopped", it had ceased to be light. This type of behaviour is generally microscopically true of all transparent media which "slow" the speed of light.

In transparent materials, the refractive index generally is greater than 1, meaning that the phase velocity is less than c. In other materials, it is possible for the refractive index to become smaller than 1 for some frequencies; in some exotic materials it is even possible for the index of refraction to become negative. The requirement that causality is not violated implies that the real and imaginary parts of the dielectric constant of any material, corresponding respectively to the index of refraction and to the attenuation coefficient, are linked by the Kramers–Kronig relations. In practical terms, this means that in a material with refractive index less than 1, the wave will be absorbed quickly.

A pulse with different group and phase velocities (which occurs if the phase velocity is not the same for all the frequencies of the pulse) smears out over time, a process known as dispersion. Certain materials have an exceptionally low (or even zero) group velocity for light waves, a phenomenon called slow light. The opposite, group velocities exceeding c, was proposed theoretically in 1993 and achieved experimentally in 2000. It should even be possible for the group velocity to become infinite or negative, with pulses travelling instantaneously or backwards in time.

None of these options allow information to be transmitted faster than c. It is impossible to transmit information with a light pulse any faster than the speed of the earliest part of the pulse (the front velocity). It can be shown that this is (under certain assumptions) always equal to c.

It is possible for a particle to travel through a medium faster than the phase velocity of light in that medium (but still slower than c). When a charged particle does that in a dielectric material, the electromagnetic equivalent of a shock wave, known as Cherenkov radiation, is emitted.

== Practical effects of finiteness ==
The speed of light is of relevance to telecommunications: the one-way and round-trip delay time are greater than zero. This applies from small to astronomical scales. On the other hand, some techniques depend on the finite speed of light, for example in distance measurements.

=== Small scales ===
In computers, the speed of light imposes a limit on how quickly data can be sent between processors. If a processor operates at 1 gigahertz, a signal can travel only a maximum of about 30 centimetres (1 ft) in a single clock cycle – in practice, this distance is even shorter since the printed circuit board refracts and slows down signals. Processors must therefore be placed close to each other, as well as memory chips, to minimize communication latencies, and care must be exercised when routing wires between them to ensure signal integrity. If clock frequencies continue to increase, the speed of light may eventually become a limiting factor for the internal design of single chips.

=== Large distances on Earth ===
Acoustic representation of the speed of light: in the period between beeps, light travels the circumference of Earth at the equator.

Given that the equatorial circumference of the Earth is about 40075 km and that c is about 300000 km/s, the theoretical shortest time for a piece of information to travel half the globe along the surface is about 67 milliseconds. When light is traveling in optical fibre (a transparent material) the actual transit time is longer, in part because the speed of light is slower by about 35% in optical fibre with an refractive index n around 1.52. Straight lines are rare in global communications and the travel time increases when signals pass through electronic switches or signal regenerators.

Although this distance is largely irrelevant for most applications, latency becomes important in fields such as high-frequency trading, where traders seek to gain minute advantages by delivering their trades to exchanges fractions of a second ahead of other traders. For example, traders have been switching to microwave communications between trading hubs, because of the advantage which radio waves travelling at near to the speed of light through air have over comparatively slower fibre optic signals.

=== Spaceflight and astronomy ===
A beam of light is depicted travelling between the Earth and the Moon in the time it takes a light pulse to move between them: 1.255 seconds at their mean orbital (surface-to-surface) distance. The relative sizes and separation of the Earth–Moon system are shown to scale.

Similarly, communications between the Earth and spacecraft are not instantaneous. There is a brief delay from the source to the receiver, which becomes more noticeable as distances increase. This delay was significant for communications between ground control and Apollo 8 when it became the first crewed spacecraft to orbit the Moon: for every question, the ground control station had to wait at least three seconds for the answer to arrive.

The communications delay between Earth and Mars can vary between five and twenty minutes depending upon the relative positions of the two planets. As a consequence of this, if a robot on the surface of Mars were to encounter a problem, its human controllers would not be aware of it until approximately 4–24 minutes later. It would then take a further 4–24 minutes for commands to travel from Earth to Mars.

Receiving light and other signals from distant astronomical sources takes much longer. For example, it takes 13 billion (13×10^{9}) years for light to travel to Earth from the faraway galaxies viewed in the Hubble Ultra-Deep Field images. Those photographs, taken today, capture images of the galaxies as they appeared 13 billion years ago, when the universe was less than a billion years old. The fact that more distant objects appear to be younger, due to the finite speed of light, allows astronomers to infer the evolution of stars, of galaxies, and of the universe itself.

Astronomical distances are sometimes expressed in light-years, especially in popular science publications and media. A light-year is the distance light travels in one Julian year, which is to say around 9.46 trillion kilometres, 5.88 trillion miles, or 0.3066 parsec. In round figures, one could say a light year is about 9.5 or even 10 trillion kilometres, and nearly 5.9 or even 6 trillion miles. Proxima Centauri, the closest star to Earth after the Sun, for example, is around 4.2 light-years away.

=== Distance measurement ===
Radar systems measure the distance to a target by the time it takes a radio-wave pulse to return to the radar antenna after being reflected by the target: the distance to the target is half the round-trip transit time multiplied by the speed of light. A Global Positioning System (GPS) receiver measures its distance to GPS satellites based on how long it takes for a radio signal to arrive from each satellite, and from these distances calculates the receiver's position. Because light travels about 300000 kilometres (186000 miles) in one second, these measurements of small fractions of a second must be very precise. The Lunar Laser Ranging experiment, radar astronomy and the Deep Space Network determine distances to the Moon, planets and spacecraft, respectively, by measuring round-trip transit times.

== Determination ==
There are different ways to determine the value of c. One way is to measure directly the speed at which light waves propagate, which can be done in various astronomical and Earth-based setups. It is also possible to determine c from other physical laws where it appears, for example, by determining the values of the electromagnetic constants ε_{0} and μ_{0} and using their relation to c. Historically, the most accurate results have been obtained by separately determining the frequency and wavelength of a light beam, with their product equalling c. This is described in more detail in the "Interferometry" section below.

In 1983 the metre was defined as "the length of the path travelled by light in vacuum during a time interval of 1/299792458 of a second", fixing the value of the speed of light at 299792458 m/s by definition, as described below. Consequently, accurate measurements of the speed of light yield an accurate realization of the metre rather than an accurate value of c.

=== Astronomical measurements ===
Measurement of the speed of light from the time it takes Io to orbit Jupiter, using eclipses of Io by Jupiter's shadow to precisely measure its orbit.

Outer space is a convenient setting for measuring the speed of light because of its large scale and nearly perfect vacuum. Typically, one measures the time needed for light to traverse some reference distance in the Solar System, such as the radius of the Earth's orbit. Historically, such measurements could be made fairly accurately, compared to how accurately the length of the reference distance is known in Earth-based units.

Ole Rømer used an astronomical measurement to make the first quantitative estimate of the speed of light in the year 1676. When measured from Earth, the periods of moons orbiting a distant planet are shorter when the Earth is approaching the planet than when the Earth is receding from it. The difference is small, but the cumulative time becomes significant when measured over months. The distance travelled by light from the planet (or its moon) to Earth is shorter when the Earth is at the point in its orbit that is closest to its planet than when the Earth is at the farthest point in its orbit, the difference in distance being the diameter of the Earth's orbit around the Sun. The observed change in the moon's orbital period is caused by the difference in the time it takes light to traverse the shorter or longer distance. Rømer observed this effect for Jupiter's innermost major moon Io and deduced that light takes 22 minutes to cross the diameter of the Earth's orbit.

Aberration of light: light from a distant source appears to be from a different location for a moving telescope due to the finite speed of light.

Another method is to use the aberration of light, discovered and explained by James Bradley in the 18th century. This effect results from the vector addition of the velocity of light arriving from a distant source (such as a star) and the velocity of its observer. A moving observer thus sees the light coming from a slightly different direction and consequently sees the source at a position shifted from its original position. Since the direction of the Earth's velocity changes continuously as the Earth orbits the Sun, this effect causes the apparent position of stars to move around. From the angular difference in the position of stars (maximally 20.5 arcseconds) it is possible to express the speed of light in terms of the Earth's velocity around the Sun, which with the known length of a year can be converted to the time needed to travel from the Sun to the Earth. In 1729, Bradley used this method to derive that light travelled 10210 times faster than the Earth in its orbit (the modern figure is 10066 times faster) or, equivalently, that it would take light 8 minutes 12 seconds to travel from the Sun to the Earth (modern figure 8 minutes 19 seconds on average).

==== Astronomical unit ====
Historically the speed of light was used together with timing measurements to determine a value for the astronomical unit (AU). The astronomical unit was redefined in 2012 as exactly 149597870700 m. This redefinition is analogous to that of the metre and likewise has the effect of fixing the speed of light to an exact value in astronomical units per second (via the exact speed of light in metres per second).

=== Time of flight techniques ===
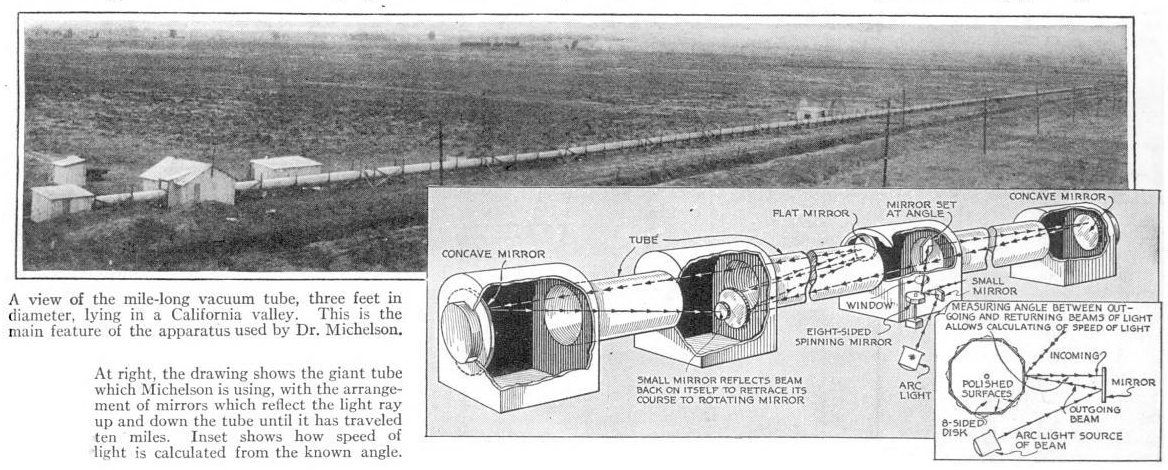
One of the last and most accurate time of flight measurements, Michelson, Pease and Pearson's 1930–1935 experiment used a rotating mirror and a one-mile (1.6 km) long vacuum chamber which the light beam traversed 10 times. It achieved accuracy of ±11 km/s.

Diagram of the Fizeau apparatus: 1. Light source; 2. Beam-splitting semi-transparent mirror; 3. Toothed wheel-breaker of the light beam; 4. Remote mirror; 5. Telescopic tube

A method of measuring the speed of light is to measure the time needed for light to travel to a mirror at a known distance and back. This is the working principle behind experiments by Hippolyte Fizeau and Léon Foucault.

The setup as used by Fizeau consists of a beam of light directed at a mirror 8 kilometres (5 mi) away. On the way from the source to the mirror, the beam passes through a rotating cogwheel. At a certain rate of rotation, the beam passes through one gap on the way out and another on the way back, but at slightly higher or lower rates, the beam strikes a tooth and does not pass through the wheel. Knowing the distance between the wheel and the mirror, the number of teeth on the wheel, and the rate of rotation, the speed of light can be calculated.

The method of Foucault replaces the cogwheel with a rotating mirror. Because the mirror keeps rotating while the light travels to the distant mirror and back, the light is reflected from the rotating mirror at a different angle on its way out than it is on its way back. From this difference in angle, the known speed of rotation and the distance to the distant mirror the speed of light may be calculated. Foucault used this apparatus to measure the speed of light in air versus water, based on a suggestion by François Arago.

Today, using oscilloscopes with time resolutions of less than one nanosecond, the speed of light can be directly measured by timing the delay of a light pulse from a laser or an LED reflected from a mirror. This method is less precise (with errors of the order of 1%) than other modern techniques, but it is sometimes used as a laboratory experiment in college physics classes.

=== Electromagnetic constants ===
An option for deriving c that does not directly depend on a measurement of the propagation of electromagnetic waves is to use the relation between c and the vacuum permittivity ε_{0} and vacuum permeability μ_{0} established by Maxwell's theory: c^{2} = 1/(ε_{0}μ_{0}). The vacuum permittivity may be determined by measuring the capacitance and dimensions of a capacitor, whereas the value of the vacuum permeability was historically fixed at exactly 4π×10^{−7} H⋅m^{−1} through the definition of the ampere. Rosa and Dorsey used this method in 1907 to find a value of 299710±22 km/s. Their method depended upon having a standard unit of electrical resistance, the "international ohm", and so its accuracy was limited by how this standard was defined.

=== Cavity resonance ===
Electromagnetic standing waves in a cavity

Another way to measure the speed of light is to independently measure the frequency f and wavelength λ of an electromagnetic wave in vacuum. The value of c can then be found by using the relation c = λf. One option is to measure the resonance frequency of a cavity resonator. If the dimensions of the resonance cavity are also known, these can be used to determine the wavelength of the wave. In 1946, Louis Essen and A. C. Gordon-Smith established the frequency for a variety of normal modes of microwaves of a microwave cavity of precisely known dimensions. The dimensions were established to an accuracy of about ±0.8 μm using gauges calibrated by interferometry. As the wavelength of the modes was known from the geometry of the cavity and from electromagnetic theory, knowledge of the associated frequencies enabled a calculation of the speed of light.

The Essen–Gordon-Smith result, 299792±9 km/s, was substantially more precise than those found by optical techniques. By 1950, repeated measurements by Essen established a result of 299792.5±3.0 km/s.

A household demonstration of this technique is possible, using a microwave oven and food such as marshmallows or margarine: if the turntable is removed so that the food does not move, it will cook the fastest at the antinodes (the points at which the wave amplitude is the greatest), where it will begin to melt. The distance between two such spots is half the wavelength of the microwaves; by measuring this distance and multiplying the wavelength by the microwave frequency (usually displayed on the back of the oven, typically 2450 MHz), the value of c can be calculated, "often with less than 5% error".

=== Interferometry ===
An interferometric determination of length. Left: constructive interference; Right: destructive interference.

Interferometry is another method to find the wavelength of electromagnetic radiation for determining the speed of light. A coherent beam of light (e.g. from a laser), with a known frequency f, is split to follow two paths and then recombined. By adjusting the path length while observing the interference pattern and carefully measuring the change in path length, the wavelength of the light λ can be determined. The speed of light is then calculated using the equation c = λf.

Before the advent of laser technology, coherent radio sources were used for interferometry measurements of the speed of light. Interferometric determination of wavelength becomes less precise with wavelength and the experiments were thus limited in precision by the long wavelength (~4 mm [0.16 in]) of the radiowaves. The precision can be improved by using light with a shorter wavelength, but then it becomes difficult to directly measure the frequency of the light.

One way around this problem is to start with a low frequency signal of which the frequency can be precisely measured, and from this signal progressively synthesize higher frequency signals whose frequency can then be linked to the original signal. A laser can then be locked to the frequency, and its wavelength can be determined using interferometry. This technique was due to a group at the National Bureau of Standards (which later became the National Institute of Standards and Technology). They used it in 1972 to measure the speed of light in vacuum with a fractional uncertainty of 3.5×10^{−9}.

== History ==
The speed of light was initially viewed as a property of light alone. With Maxwell's theory of electromagnetism, its role grew to encompass many more phenomena. Once Einstein developed special relativity, the speed of light became the basis of causality across all of physics. In recent times it is used to define length for all international standard measurements.

=== Early history ===
Empedocles (c. 490–430 BCE) was the first to propose a theory of light and claimed that light has a finite speed. He maintained that light was something in motion, and therefore must take some time to travel. Aristotle argued, to the contrary, that "light is due to the presence of something, but it is not a movement". Euclid and Ptolemy advanced Empedocles' emission theory of vision, where light is emitted from the eye, thus enabling sight. Based on that theory, Heron of Alexandria argued that the speed of light must be infinite because distant objects such as stars appear immediately upon opening the eyes.

Early Islamic philosophers initially agreed with the Aristotelian view that light had no speed of travel. In 1021, Alhazen (Ibn al-Haytham) published the Book of Optics, in which he presented a series of arguments dismissing the emission theory of vision in favour of the now accepted intromission theory, in which light moves from an object into the eye. This led Alhazen to propose that light must have a finite speed, and that the speed of light is variable, decreasing in denser bodies. He argued that light is substantial matter, the propagation of which requires time, even if this is hidden from the senses. Also in the 11th century, Abū Rayhān al-Bīrūnī agreed that light has a finite speed, and observed that the speed of light is much faster than the speed of sound.

In the 13th century, Roger Bacon argued that the speed of light in air was not infinite, using philosophical arguments backed by the writing of Alhazen and Aristotle. In the 1270s, Witelo considered the possibility of light travelling at infinite speed in vacuum, but slowing down in denser bodies.

In the early 17th century, Johannes Kepler believed that the speed of light was infinite since empty space presents no obstacle to it. René Descartes argued that if the speed of light were to be finite, the Sun, Earth, and Moon would be noticeably out of alignment during a lunar eclipse. Although this argument fails when aberration of light is taken into account, the latter was not recognized until the following century. Since such misalignment had not been observed, Descartes concluded the speed of light was infinite. Descartes speculated that if the speed of light were found to be finite, his whole system of philosophy might be demolished. Despite this, in his derivation of Snell's law, Descartes assumed that some kind of motion associated with light was faster in denser media. Pierre de Fermat derived Snell's law using the opposing assumption, the denser the medium the slower light travelled. Fermat also argued in support of a finite speed of light.

=== First measurement attempts ===
In 1629, Isaac Beeckman proposed an experiment in which a person observes the flash of a cannon reflecting off a mirror about one mile (1.6 km) away. In 1638, Galileo Galilei proposed an experiment, with an apparent claim to having performed it some years earlier, to measure the speed of light by observing the delay between uncovering a lantern and its perception some distance away. He was unable to distinguish whether light travel was instantaneous or not, but concluded that if it were not, it must nevertheless be extraordinarily rapid. According to Galileo, the lanterns he used were "at a short distance, less than a mile". Assuming the distance was not too much shorter than a mile, and that "about a thirtieth of a second is the minimum time interval distinguishable by the unaided eye", Boyer notes that Galileo's experiment could at best be said to have established a lower limit of about 60 miles per second for the velocity of light. In 1667, the Accademia del Cimento of Florence reported that it had performed Galileo's experiment, with the lanterns separated by about one mile, but no delay was observed. The actual delay in this experiment would have been about 11 microseconds.

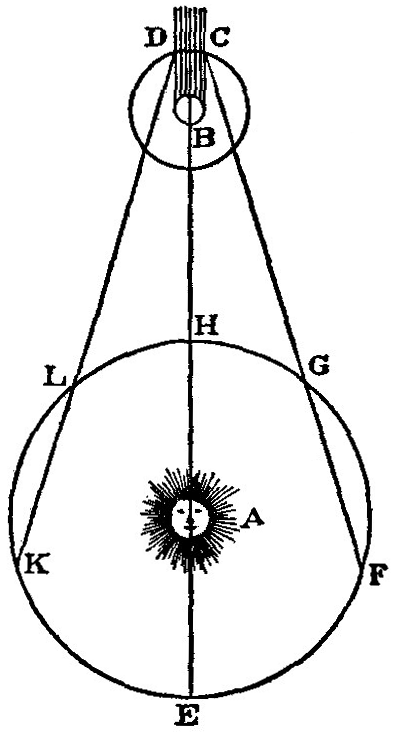
Rømer's observations of the occultations of Io from Earth

The first quantitative estimate of the speed of light was made in 1676 by Ole Rømer. From the observation that the periods of Jupiter's innermost moon Io appeared to be shorter when the Earth was approaching Jupiter than when receding from it, he concluded that light travels at a finite speed, and estimated that it takes light 22 minutes to cross the diameter of Earth's orbit. Christiaan Huygens combined this estimate with an estimate for the diameter of the Earth's orbit to obtain an estimate of speed of light of 220000 km/s, which is 27% lower than the actual value.

In his 1704 book Opticks, Isaac Newton reported Rømer's calculations of the finite speed of light and gave a value of "seven or eight minutes" for the time taken for light to travel from the Sun to the Earth (the modern value is 8 minutes 19 seconds). Newton queried whether Rømer's eclipse shadows were coloured. Hearing that they were not, he concluded the different colours travelled at the same speed. In 1729, James Bradley discovered stellar aberration. From this effect he determined that light must travel 10,210 times faster than the Earth in its orbit (the modern figure is 10,066 times faster) or, equivalently, that it would take light 8 minutes 12 seconds to travel from the Sun to the Earth.

=== Improved measurements ===
In the 19th century Hippolyte Fizeau developed a method to determine the speed of light based on time-of-flight measurements on Earth and reported a value of 315000 km/s. His method was improved upon by Léon Foucault who obtained a value of 298000 km/s in 1862. In the year 1856, Wilhelm Eduard Weber and Rudolf Kohlrausch measured the ratio of the electromagnetic and electrostatic units of charge, 1/√ε_{0}μ_{0}, by discharging a Leyden jar, and found that its numerical value was very close to the speed of light as measured directly by Fizeau. The following year Gustav Kirchhoff calculated that an electric signal in a resistanceless wire travels along the wire at this speed.

History of measurements of c (in m/s)
Year	Experiment	Value	Deviation from 1983 value
<1638	Galileo, covered lanterns	inconclusive	
<1667	Accademia del Cimento, covered lanterns	inconclusive	
1675	Rømer and Huygens, moons of Jupiter	220000000	−27%
1729	James Bradley, aberration of light	301000000	+0.40%
1849	Hippolyte Fizeau, toothed wheel	315000000	+5.1%
1862	Léon Foucault, rotating mirror	298000000±500000	−0.60%
1875	Werner Siemens	260 000 000	−13.3%
1893	Heinrich Hertz	200 000 000	−33.3%
1907	Rosa and Dorsey, EM constants	299710000±30000	−280 ppm
1926	Albert A. Michelson, rotating mirror	299796000±4000	+12 ppm
1950	Essen and Gordon-Smith, cavity resonator	299792500±3000	+0.14 ppm
1958	K. D. Froome, radio interferometry	299792500±100	+0.14 ppm
1972	Evenson et al., laser interferometry	299792456.2±1.1	−0.006 ppm
1983	17th CGPM, definition of the metre	299792458 (exact)	—N/a

=== Connections with electromagnetism ===
In the early 1860s, Maxwell showed that, according to the theory of electromagnetism he was working on, electromagnetic waves propagate in empty space at a speed equal to the above Weber/Kohlrausch ratio, and drawing attention to the numerical proximity of this value to the speed of light as measured by Fizeau, he proposed that light and electromagnetic phenomena are oscillations of the same medium. Maxwell backed up his claim with his own experiment published in the 1868 Philosophical Transactions which determined the ratio of the electrostatic and electromagnetic units of electricity. Scientists were initially skeptical of this unification. Experimental evidence accumulated by scientists like Heinrich Hertz eventually built the case that light is a form of electromagnetism.

=== "Luminiferous aether" ===
That light propagated as wave in a medium called aether or luminiferous aether was theory with a long and detailed history. With the unification of light and electromagnetic waves, the character of this medium gained additional attention. According to Maxwell's equations, the speed of electromagnetic waves are independent of the velocity. Assuming the waves propagated in an aether, this velocity would be a characteristic of the aether, making the aether act as a preferred frame of reference. This would contradict Galilean invariance, the principle that the laws of physics do not change when the objects involved move at the same uniform velocity. One prediction of a preferred frame would be different speeds of light as the Earth moved with respect to the aether. Beginning in the 1880s several experiments were performed to try to detect this motion, the most famous of which is the experiment performed by Albert A. Michelson and Edward W. Morley in 1887. The detected motion was found to always be nil (within observational error). Modern experiments indicate that the two-way speed of light is isotropic (the same in every direction) to within 6 nanometres per second.

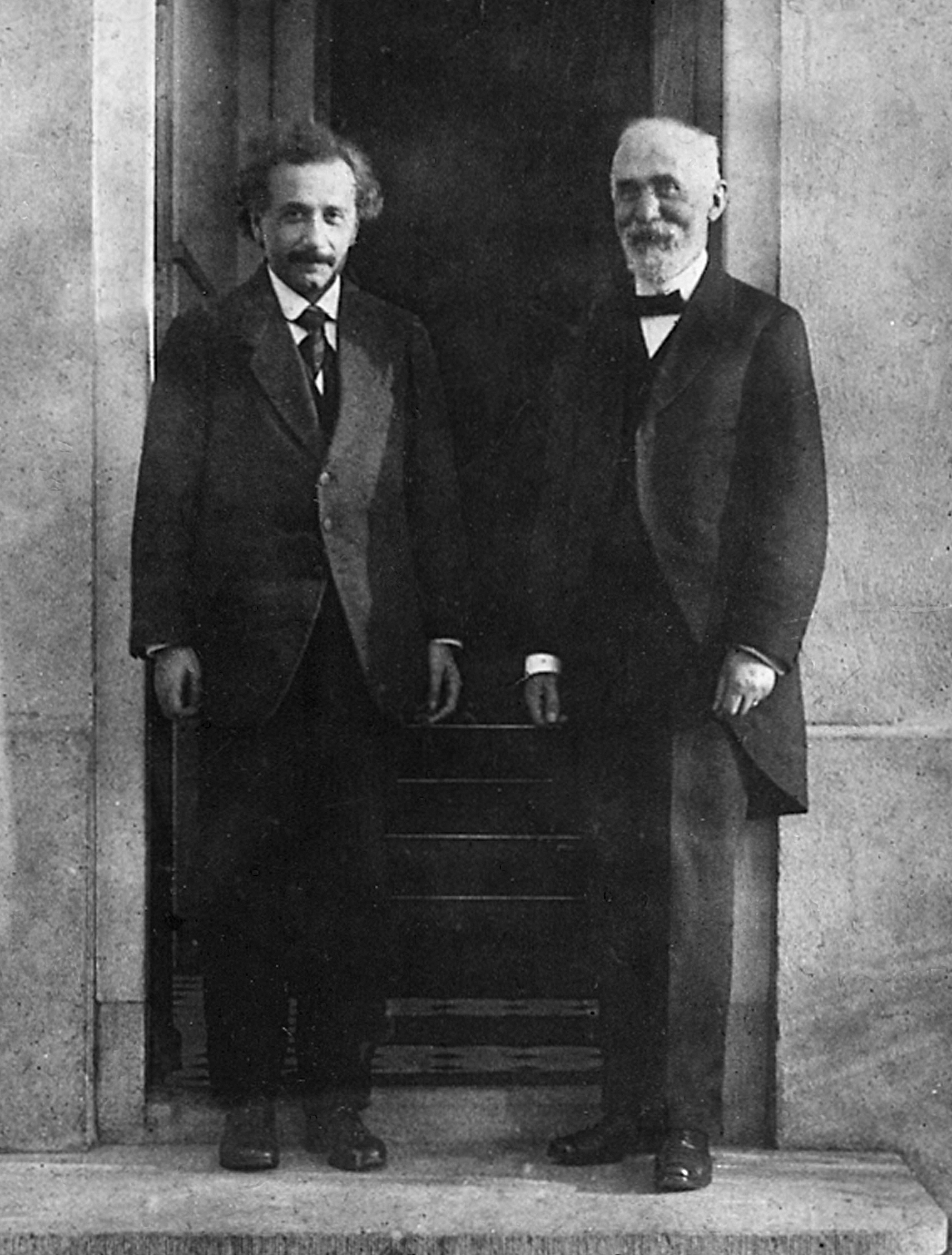
Hendrik Lorentz (right) with Albert Einstein (1921)

Because of Michelson-Morley experiment Hendrik Lorentz proposed that the motion of the apparatus through the aether may cause the apparatus to contract along its length in the direction of motion, and he further assumed that the time variable for moving systems must also be changed accordingly ("local time"), which led to the formulation of the Lorentz transformation. Based on Lorentz's aether theory, Henri Poincaré (1900) showed that this local time (to first order in v/c) is indicated by clocks moving in the aether, which are synchronized under the assumption of constant light speed. In 1904, he speculated that the speed of light could be a limiting velocity in dynamics, provided that the assumptions of Lorentz's theory are all confirmed. In 1905, Poincaré brought Lorentz's aether theory into full observational agreement with the principle of relativity.

=== Special relativity ===
In 1905 Einstein postulated from the outset that the speed of light in vacuum, measured by a non-accelerating observer, is independent of the motion of the source or observer. Using this and the principle of relativity as a basis he derived the special theory of relativity, in which the speed of light in vacuum c featured as a fundamental constant, also appearing in contexts unrelated to light. This made the concept of the stationary aether (to which Lorentz and Poincaré still adhered) useless and revolutionized the concepts of space and time.

=== Increased accuracy of c and redefinition of the metre and second ===
In the second half of the 20th century, much progress was made in increasing the accuracy of measurements of the speed of light, first by cavity resonance techniques and later by laser interferometer techniques. These were aided by new, more precise, definitions of the metre and second. In 1950, Louis Essen determined the speed as 299792.5±3.0 km/s, using cavity resonance. This value was adopted by the 12th General Assembly of the Radio-Scientific Union in 1957. In 1960, the metre was redefined in terms of the wavelength of a particular spectral line of krypton-86, and, in 1967, the second was redefined in terms of the hyperfine transition frequency of the ground state of caesium-133.

In 1972, using the laser interferometer method and the new definitions, a group at the US National Bureau of Standards in Boulder, Colorado determined the speed of light in vacuum to be c = 299792456.2±1.1 m/s. This was 100 times less uncertain than the previously accepted value. The remaining uncertainty was mainly related to the definition of the metre. As similar experiments found comparable results for c, the 15th General Conference on Weights and Measures in 1975 recommended using the value 299792458 m/s for the speed of light.

=== Defined as an explicit constant ===
In 1983 the 17th meeting of the General Conference on Weights and Measures (CGPM) found that wavelengths from frequency measurements and a given value for the speed of light are more reproducible than the previous standard. They kept the 1967 definition of second, so the caesium hyperfine frequency would now determine both the second and the metre. To do this, they redefined the metre as "the length of the path traveled by light in vacuum during a time interval of 1/299792458 of a second".

As a result of this definition, the value of the speed of light in vacuum is exactly 299792458 m/s and has become a defined constant in the SI system of units. Improved experimental techniques that, prior to 1983, would have measured the speed of light no longer affect the known value of the speed of light in SI units, but instead allow a more precise realization of the metre by more accurately measuring the wavelength of krypton-86 and other light sources.

In 2011, the CGPM stated its intention to redefine all seven SI base units using what it calls "the explicit-constant formulation", where each "unit is defined indirectly by specifying explicitly an exact value for a well-recognized fundamental constant", as was done for the speed of light. It proposed a new, but completely equivalent, wording of the metre's definition: "The metre, symbol m, is the unit of length; its magnitude is set by fixing the numerical value of the speed of light in vacuum to be equal to exactly 299792458 when it is expressed in the SI unit m s^{−1}." This was one of the changes that was incorporated in the 2019 revision of the SI, also termed the New SI.

== See also ==
- Light-second
- Speed of electricity
- Speed of gravity
- Speed of sound
- Velocity factor
- Warp factor (fictional)
