= Fizeau's measurement of the speed of light in air =

1848 experiment by Hippolyte Fizeau

From 1848 to 1849, Hippolyte Fizeau used a toothed wheel apparatus to perform absolute measurements of the speed of light in air.

Subsequent experiments performed by Marie Alfred Cornu from 1872 to 1876 improved the methodology and made more accurate measurements.

== Fizeau's determination of the speed of light ==
Figure 1: Schematic of the Fizeau apparatus. The light passes on one side of a tooth on the way out, and the other side on the way back, assuming the cog rotates one tooth during transit of the light.

In 1848–49, Hippolyte Fizeau determined the speed of light using an intense limelight formed into a beam using two astronomical telescopes, one in the bell tower of his father's holiday home in Suresnes, and one 8,633 meters away on Montmartre. At the exit of the Montmartre telescope the light was reflected back to Suresnes where a second, half-silvered mirror reflected the light into Fizeau's eye. Recreations of Fizeau's experiment shows that the Montmartre telescope could be aimed back at Suresnes and a half-silvered mirror placed in the eyepiece where one might normally install crosshairs. Adjusting the Montmartre to see the Suresnes and the half-silvered mirror simultaneously ensure that the mirror is image plane of the remote object. A slight turn of the telescope positions the reflecting half of the mirror to return the light to Suresnes where the second telescope can be aligned with the one containing the mirror. The procedure can be completed by a single person traveling between the telescopes.

The light source was interrupted by a cogwheel with 720 notches that could be rotated at a variable speed. The wheel was driven through a 500:1 gear system by weights falling to the floor. The maximum rotational speed was just less than 41 revolutions per second. After the initial acceleration the rotation reaches a constant speed for the last 110 seconds, during which time the measurement can be made. (Figure 1) Fizeau increased the rotation speed of the cogwheel until light passing through one notch of the cogwheel would be completely eclipsed by the adjacent tooth. At 12.6 rotations per second, the light was eclipsed. At twice this speed (25.2 rotations per second), it was again visible as it passed through the next notch. At 3 times the speed it was again eclipsed. Given the rotational speed of the wheel and the distance between the wheel and the mirror, Fizeau was able to calculate a value of 2 × 8633m × 720 × 25.2/s = 313,274,304 m/s for the speed of light. Fizeau's value for the speed of light was 4.5% too high. The correct value is 299,792,458 m/s. It was difficult for Fizeau to visually estimate the intensity minimum of the light being blocked by the adjacent teeth. Other sources of error include the measurement of the distance from the wheel to the mirror, and the measurement of the speed of rotation of the wheel. Fizeau's paper appeared in Comptes Rendus Hebdomadaires de séances de l’Academie de Sciences (Paris, Vol. 29 [July–December 1849], pp. 90–92).

== Cornu's refinement of the Fizeau experiment ==
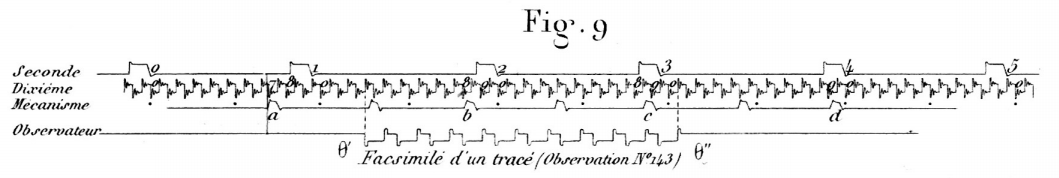
Figure 2: Chronograph record from Cornu's speed of light determination shows wheel rotations, timing signals based on the observatory clock, and observer markings.

At the behest of the Paris Observatory under Urbain Le Verrier, Marie Alfred Cornu repeated Fizeau's 1848 toothed wheel measurement in a series of experiments from 1872 to 1876. The goal was to obtain a value for the speed of light accurate to one part in a thousand. Cornu's equipment allowed him to monitor high orders of extinction, up to the 21st order. Instead of estimating the intensity minimum of the light being blocked by the adjacent teeth, a relatively inaccurate procedure, Cornu made pairs of observations on either side of the intensity minima, averaging the values obtained with the wheel spun clockwise and counterclockwise. An electric circuit recorded the wheel rotations on a chronograph chart, which enabled precise rate comparisons against the observatory clock. A telegraph key arrangement allowed Cornu to mark the precise moments when he judged that extinction had been entered on this same chart or exited. His final experiment was run over a path nearly three times as long as that used by Fizeau. This experiment yielded a figure of 300,400,000 m/s, which is 0.2% above the actual value.

== See also ==
- Speed of light § Measurement
- Fizeau's measurement of the speed of light moving water
- Foucault's measurements of the speed of light
- History of Suresnes
