= James William MacGauley =

Irish priest and scientist

James William MacGauley (c.1806–1867) was an Irish Catholic priest, physicist, and inventor.

== Life ==
MacGauley was born around 1806 into a Catholic family at Kilmainham, Dublin, where his father Benjamin was a carpenter. After school in Dublin, he went to St Patrick's College, Maynooth to train for the priesthood, where the physicist Nicholas Callan gave him scientific interests. He was a priest at St. Mary's Church, Dublin He then served as professor of natural philosophy to the Board of National Education in Ireland, from 1836 to 1856. As part of his work, he ran a laboratory in Marlborough Street, Dublin, in the Board's headquarters.

MacGauley emigrated to Canada about 1856, and was there to around 1865, when he settled in England. He became a member of the council of the Inventors' Institute (of London), and took an active part in the executive committee of that body, and was one of the editors as well as a contributor to their organ, the Scientific Review. At the time of his death, on 25 October 1867, he was also managing director to the Inventors' Patentright Association.

== Works ==
In 1837 MacGaulay worked on an electric interrupter related to that of Charles Grafton Page. It was in a line of development of the induction coil that began with Nicholas Callan, and was taken up by Golding Bird, William Neeves and Ernst Neeff by 1840. MacGaulay's trembler interrupter became standard in the electric bell.

MacGauley's major published works were:

- Lectures on Natural Philosophy, Dublin, 1840; 3rd edit. 1851.
- The Elements of Architecture, Dublin, 1846.
- A Key to the Treatise on Arithmetic . . . used in the Irish National Schools, Dublin, 1852.
- A Treatise on Algebra, Dublin, 1854.

He also wrote papers on "Natural Philosophy and Chemistry", which appeared in the Reports of the British Association, the Philosophical Magazine, the Chemical News, and the Scientific Review, between 1835 and 1867.

== Family ==
MacGaulay left the priesthood around 1856, and on 30 March 1857 married Julia Frances Cahill (daughter of Patrick Cahill) in Boston, Massachusetts. The marriage certificate lists him as aged 48, which implies he was born in 1807 or 1808. They had four children.

== Notes ==
Attribution

This article incorporates text from a publication now in the public domain: Lee, Sidney, ed. (1893). "M'Gauley, James William". Dictionary of National Biography. Vol. 35. London: Smith, Elder & Co.
