= Trembler coil =

Part of early car ignition systems

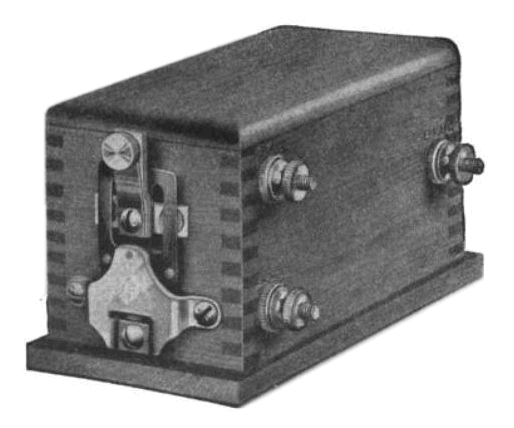
A trembler coil, around 1915. The mechanism on the end is the "trembler" or interrupter.

A trembler coil, buzz coil or vibrator coil is a type of high-voltage ignition coil used in the ignition system of early automobiles, most notably the Benz Patent-Motorwagen and the Ford Model T. Its distinguishing feature is a vibrating magnetically-activated contact called a trembler or interrupter, which breaks the primary current, generating multiple sparks during each cylinder's power stroke. Trembler coils were first used on the 1886 Benz automobile, and were used on the Model T until 1927.

== Operation ==
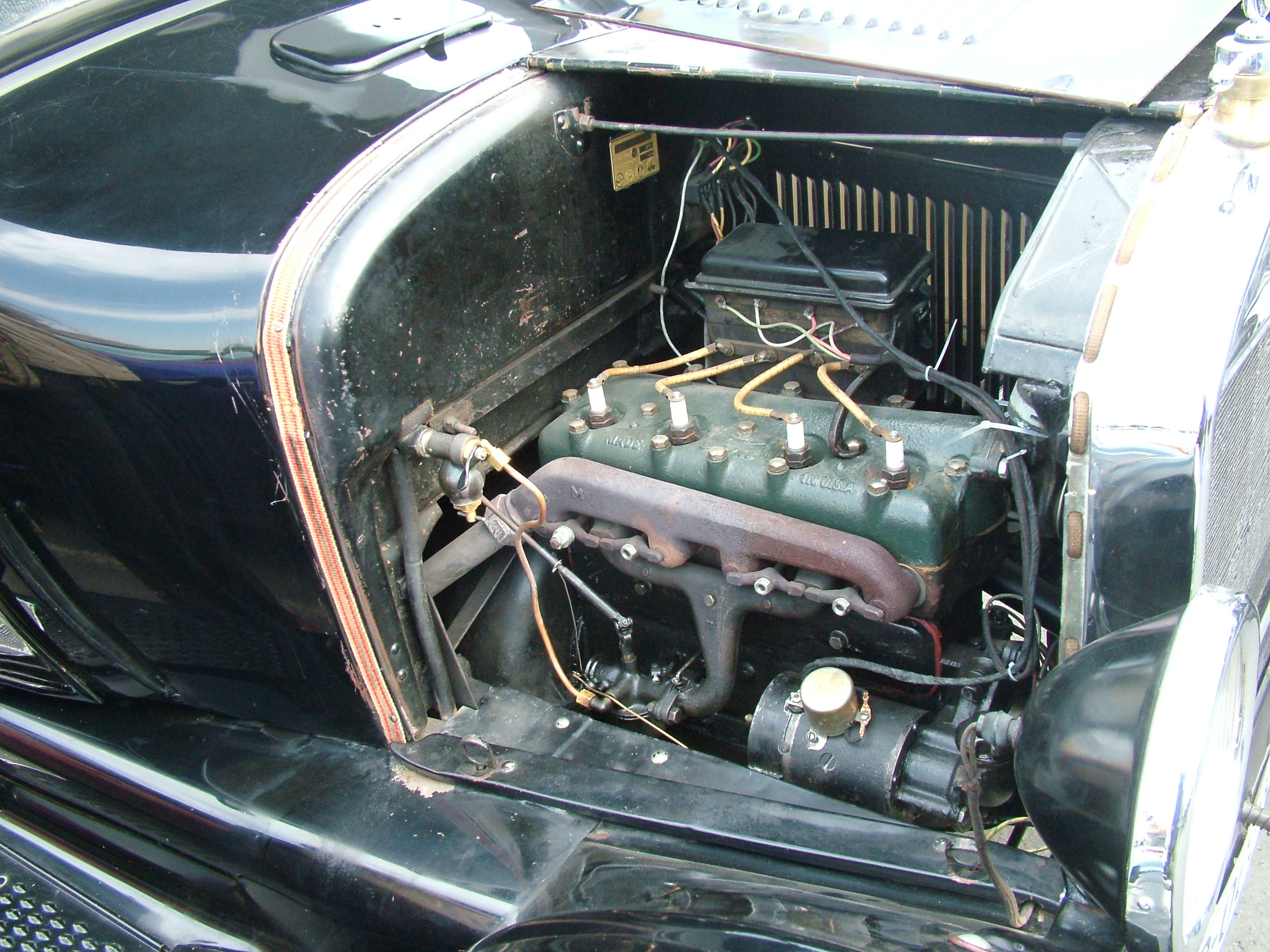
Ford Model T engine. The rectangular black box behind the engine contains the trembler coils

The trembler coil was a device called a Ruhmkorff or induction coil, widely used in the 19th century. It combines two magnetic devices on the same iron-cored solenoid. The first is a transformer, used to transform low voltage electricity to a high voltage, suitable for an engine's spark plug. Two coils of wire are wound around an iron core. The primary winding carries the low voltage battery current, and the secondary winding generates the high voltage for the spark plug. Attached to the end of the coil is an interrupter or trembler, a magnetically operated switch, which repeatedly breaks the primary current to create flux changes in the transformer needed to produce high voltage.

The switch contacts are on a springy iron arm, which holds them closed. The arm is mounted near the iron core. When battery power is applied, the coil acts as an electromagnet; the magnetic field from the core pulls the springy iron arm, opening the switch contacts, interrupting the primary current. The magnetic field of the core is switched off, allowing the arm to spring back, closing the contacts again. Then the primary current is turned on again, and the magnetic field opens the contacts again. This cycle repeats many times per second, while power is applied to the coil. A similar mechanism is used in the electric bell.

As the circuit opens each time, the energy stored in the solenoid's magnetic field is released and by electromagnetic induction produces a pulse of high voltage in the secondary coil winding. This voltage is sufficient to fire a spark plug located in the engine's cylinder, igniting the petrol mixture.

The difference between a trembler coil and a modern ignition coil is that in a modern coil the primary current is broken only once by the contact breaker for each cycle of the piston, creating a single spark which is precisely timed to ignite the fuel at the correct point in the cycle. In the trembler coil, in contrast, the vibrating interrupter contact breaks the current multiple times during each cycle, creating multiple pulses of high voltage and multiple sparks.

The trembler coil operates equally well from AC or DC electricity. In the Model T, a battery was used for starting, but once the engine started the supply was switched to the magneto. The Model T was unusual in being fitted with an AC alternator (a permanent magnet magneto) rather than a DC dynamo. In those early days, this was not rectified and so the alternator's output remained as AC. This was entirely adequate to operate the ignition system, and after 1915 to power electric headlights, although it could not be used for battery charging.

== Origins ==
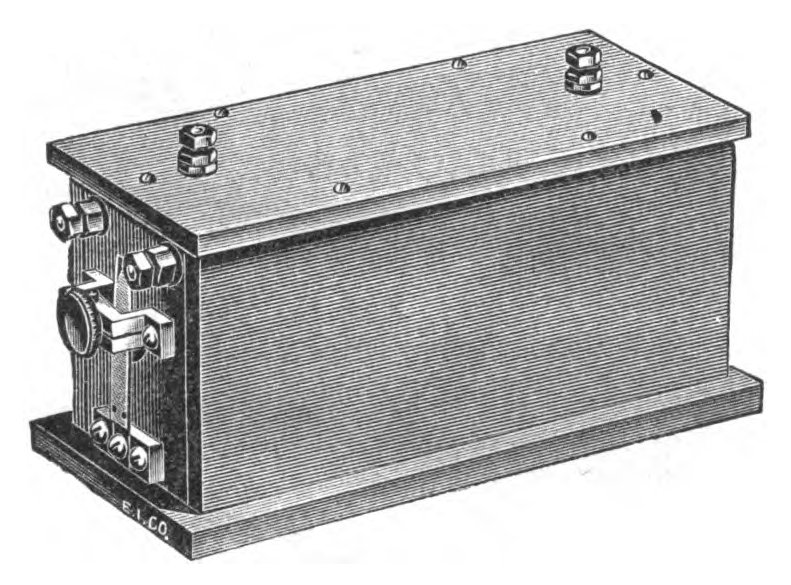
Another trembler coil

The trembler coil was an induction coil, developed during the 1880s from a device invented by Charles Grafton Page and independently by Nicholas Callan in 1836. It was widely used around the turn of the century to produce high voltage for spark-gap radio transmitters, x-ray machines, arc lights, and medical electrotherapy devices. It was simply adopted for use in automobiles.

A simpler device, the low tension coil, was already in use for stationary engines and spark-ignition gas engines. This was a simple iron-core inductor, used with a battery and a switch called a contact breaker. It had a single winding and so was not a transformer like the trembler coil. When the piston was at the right point, the contact breaker opened, breaking the battery current. Self-induction due to the collapsing magnetic field generated a high voltage pulse in the coil, which was applied to the spark plug. The drawback of the low tension coil was that the high ignition voltage was generated in the same circuit that the low voltage battery current flowed in.

== Use for car ignition systems ==
In the Ford Model T, four trembler coils were used, one for each cylinder. This was a precursor of the modern use of individual plug-top coils (coil on plug), where each cylinder has its own coil, thus avoiding the need for a high voltage distributor. They were packaged together in a single wooden box, potted with pitch for reliability and waterproofing. This was sometimes called a make-and-break ignition system.

For correct operation, each cylinder must be fired in turn, and at the right time. Both of these tasks were conducted by the 'timer' or low-voltage distributor, a rotary switch. In a four-stroke engine, the timer is driven at half-crankshaft speed, like the camshaft. The timer switched the primary current to each coil in turn and also started the coils at an appropriate time in the cylinder's cycle. As was common for engines of this period, the ignition timing was also controlled by a manual advance and retard control. Starting a cold engine could require dexterous manipulation of the control to get the engine to start. Modern engines control such timing even more carefully; this is now automatic and not obvious to the driver.

A significant difference from modern ignitions is in the strength and number of sparks produced. A modern system produces one, large, spark at exactly the time commanded. The trembler coil systems cannot produce such a high energy spark, but it does produce a continuous stream of sparks for as long as the timer circuit is closed. Early engines, like the Model T, ran at slow speeds with large cylinders filled with weakly burning mixtures of low octane ratings. These were both less sensitive to the accuracy of ignition timing and their mixtures also benefited from having a sustained ignition source.

The Model T was also available in versions tuned for kerosene or ethanol fuels. Trembler ignitions were particularly suitable for igniting these mixtures. Tremblers remained popular for kerosene and TVO tractor engines long after they were obsolete for petrol.

=== Replacement ===
In time, the trembler coil system was seen as obsolete and was replaced, first by the ignition magneto and later by Kettering's battery ignition system, using battery, coil and contact breaker. These systems used a single ignition coil for the engine, supplying the spark to each cylinder in turn. A device called the distributor (previously used with magnetos) was used to switch the high-voltage current to each plug in turn. The high voltage distributor evolved from the timer and it too was a rotary switch driven at camshaft speed. The first high voltage distributors likewise used a wiping-contact, but as the current was at such a high voltage, these gave trouble with arcing and erosion of the contacts leading to a poor connection. It was realised that a jump-spark distributor would work equally well at high voltages and would be less susceptible to problems from erosion.

== Other uses ==
The wide availability of the Model T made its component parts equally widespread. The trembler coil in particular became a popular component for electrical hobbyists and backyard tinkerers, and was one of the first factory-made electrical components to be available in such numbers. They were used as shocking coils, in either the pseudo-medical or the prank sense, Model T coils were also used for some of the earliest home-made electric fences for livestock control. They were also popular with early amateur radio operators for building simple spark-gap transmitters for Morse code transmission, until the introduction of continuous-wave transmitters rendered them obsolete (and eventually banned by government agencies due to their broad-band transmissions). The Model T coils remained so popular for non-car use that they remained in production into the 1960s, years after the car itself.

=== Vibrator power supplies ===
A similar device is the vibrator power supply, used to power electronic valve radios from low-voltage batteries. Low voltage DC from the battery is chopped by a trembler circuit and this pulsed square wave used to drive a transformer, providing the 90V or so required by valves. As this application is more frequency sensitive, the vibrators were generally a separate unit, with a more stable frequency tuned reed, apart from the transformer. This transformer had output tappings for the 90V HT and also the 22V grid and 6V heater circuits required by valves. In many cases, the transformer was the same unit used for powering the radio set from domestic mains, using the same secondaries but with an additional primary winding at mains voltage.
