= Low-tension coil =

A typical low-tension coil (reproduction) used in the ignition system of an ignitor-fired engine

A low-tension coil is an electrical device used to create a spark across the points of an ignitor on early-1900s gasoline engines, generally flywheel engines, hit-and-miss engines, and other engines of that era. In modern electronic terms, a low-tension coil is simply a large inductor, an electrical device that stores energy for brief periods. The term "low tension" was the terminology of the day used to differentiate it from the term "high tension" and generally meant "low voltage" (tension) as opposed to "high voltage" (tension). High-tension coils produce high voltages, generally meant to produce a spark across a spark plug.

== Construction ==
A low-tension coil consists of an iron core that has wire wrapped around it. The size of the iron core, the number of turns of wire, and the size of the wire determine the electrical properties of the coil. Terminals are provided to connect the coil into the ignition circuit. Wood end-pieces are added for mechanical stability, for terminal placement and to hold the wire onto the coil. Further, the windings are protected with a cloth or tape covering. To minimize losses and heating from induced current, the iron core should no be solid but constructed from a bundle of thinly insulated wires or thin sheets.

== Use ==
A low-tension coil for engine ignition is used in conjunction with a battery and an ignitor. The ignitor is no more than a set of contacts that reside inside the combustion chamber of the engine. A series circuit is made between the three components: battery connects to coil, second terminal on the coil connects to the ignitor, second terminal on the ignitor (usually connected electrically and mechanically to the engine itself) connects to the second terminal of the battery.

== Multi-cylinder engines ==
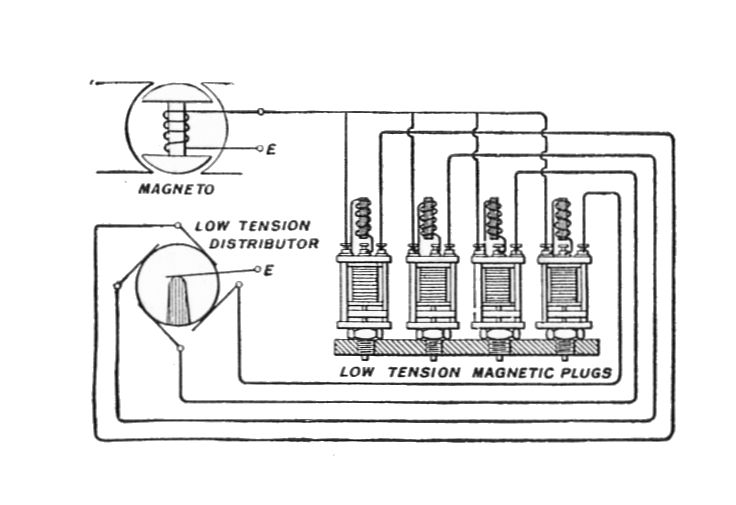
Multi-cylinder engine, with individual coils for each cylinder

The low-tension coil system was also used for multi-cylinder engines, although rarely, as it required a separate coil for each cylinder.

== Theory of operation ==
An inductor attempts to maintain a constant current flow through it. If the current in the circuit in which the inductor is connected goes down for some reason, the voltage developed across the inductor will go up in an attempt to try to maintain the constant current. When used with an ignitor ignition system in an engine, there is current flow when the ignitor contacts are closed. When the ignitor contacts are opened by the mechanical parts of the engine, current flow is interrupted. Because the low-tension coil wants to maintain that current flow, the voltage across the coil rapidly goes up (usually to several hundred volts). When the voltage rises high enough, the voltage will jump the still very small gap of the ignitor contacts and create a spark, which ignites the fuel mixture in the engine. Since there is a finite amount of energy stored in the coil, as soon as the spark jumps the gap, the voltage across the coil collapses. As soon as the engine rotates and the ignitor contacts again close, current starts to flow through the coil, and it again stores energy for the next cycle. A good description and animation of a low-tension coil in operation can be found on Harrys Old Engines Ignition Page.

== See also ==
- Ignition coil
- Inductor
- Induction coil
- Trembler coil
