= Jonathan Nash Hearder =

British electrical engineer

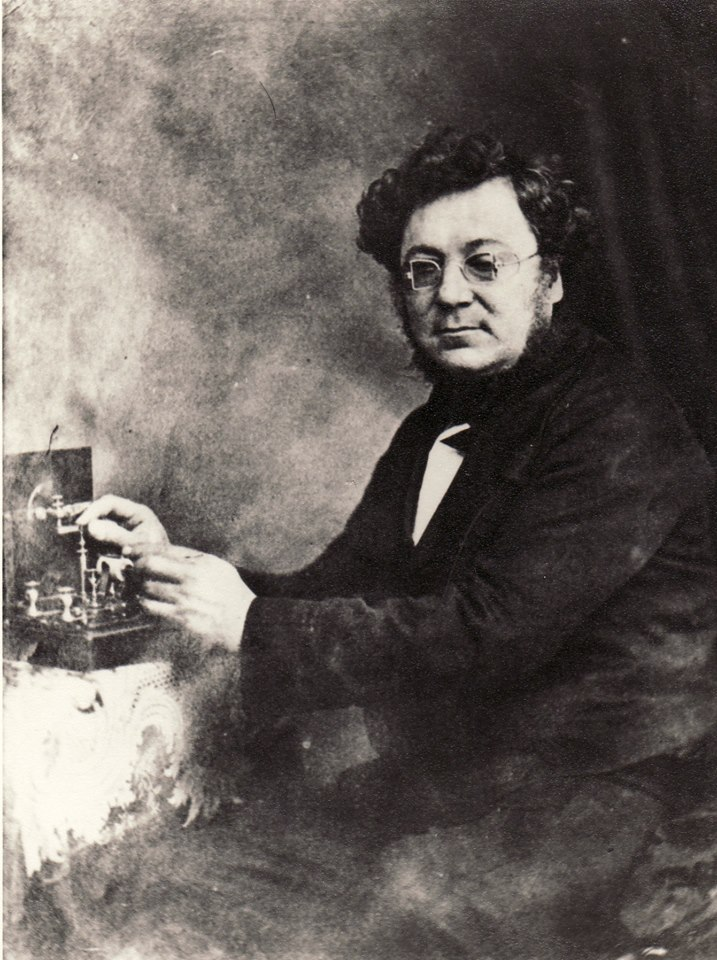
Jonathon Nash Hearder

Jonathan Nash Hearder (24 December 1809 – 16 July 1876) was a British electrical engineer, inventor, and educator. He is best known for his work in developing alternative experimental procedures for use by the blind and vision impaired, and for his early innovation in the field of induction coils.

== Biography ==
Hearder was born in Plymouth, Devon on 24 December 1809, the son of Jonathan Hearder (1775–1838, an umbrella maker and police constable) and Mary Hannah Hearder (née Parry). He was the eldest of four children, with one brother (George Parry Hearder) and two sisters (Mary Hannah Treleaven and Anne Eliza Page).

Hearder became interested in science at an early age, despite his father being "greatly averse to such pursuits". From the age of 17 Hearder gave lectures on topics of science at the Exeter Literary Institution and other local societies, including the Plymouth Institution (now The Plymouth Athenaeum), of which he was a member. He began a career as a schoolmaster, and was the first schoolmaster in Plymouth to include science as a subject in the school curriculum.

In 1830, at the age of 23, Hearder's vision was severely damaged during an accidental explosion while experimenting with the explosive compound silver fulminate. He was frequently described by many (including himself) as totally blind, although John Charles Bucknill in his book The Medical Knowledge of Shakespeare relates a demonstration given by Hearder in which Hearder claimed to be able to perceive a particularly bright flash of electrical light. It became Hearder's practice to wear green spectacles to conceal his damaged eyes.

Following the damage to his eyes, Hearder's school closed, and Hearder briefly turned to a secondary career in music. However, despite his vision impairment, Hearder continued lecturing and continued to work in experimental science, most particularly in the field of electrical engineering. He began work on developing alternative experimental procedures which did not rely on visual cues.

On 27 October 1837 Hearder married Susan Plimsaul. She died two years later in 1839. On 21 January 1840 he married his cousin Joanna Sleep Hearder (1809–1887), with whom he went on to have five children.

In 1838 Hearder's father died and Hearder assumed control of his father's umbrella-making business. He expanded the business to include the making of fishing tackle, an area in which he developed a strong reputation. According to the Royal Society of Chemistry he "could prescribe the particular fly to be used for successful troutfishing in any month, and for any stream in Devonshire." It was in this capacity that he was asked, late in life, to consult on the fishing gear that was to be used by the Challenger expedition, and in fact the expedition eventually set sail bearing trammels and trawls furnished by Hearder for use in collecting shore fish for scientific purposes.

In 1845 Hearder was appointed consulting electrician and galvanist to the South Devon and East Cornwall Hospital. In 1846, Hearder's mother died, aged 69, at the family house in Frankfort Street.

Hearder reportedly had an excellent memory, and held a passion for matters connected with local antiquity and history. He was an active member of the Devonshire Association and the Royal Polytechnic Society. In 1871 Hearder reportedly received the degrees of PhD and DSc although it is not known which institution issued the qualifications.

On 16 July 1876, at the age of 67, Hearder died of a sudden paralytic seizure while at 13 Princess Square, Plymouth. He was buried at Ford Park, Plymouth.

== Inventions ==
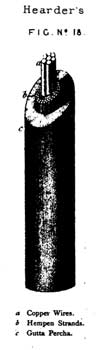
Jonathan Nash Hearder's design for a submarine telegraph cable, circa 1850.

Throughout his life, Hearder undertook significant work on the development of the induction coil. Although the invention of the induction coil is generally attributed to Heinrich Ruhmkorff, by some accounts Hearder may have independently invented the device at an earlier date. Hearder's son on one occasion vouched that he had personally conveyed his father to London to demonstrate a coil to Michael Faraday a full two years prior to the announcement of Ruhmkorff's design.

In 1853 and 1854 Hearder exhibited "an induction coil, constructed by himself, with a condensor which he also made himself, on principles which he had worked out [..] which gave with 4 cells of Groves's battery, better results than were obtained with the best instruments constructed by Ruhmkorff at that time."

In September 1856, Hearder was awarded the first Silver Medal of the Royal Cornwall Polytechnic Society for his exhibition of "an arrangement of primary and secondary wires, with which sparks were obtained in air, and discharges several inches long, through rarefied air, and with which Leyden jars were charged." This induction coil represented a substantial improvement over Heinrich Ruhmkorff's more famous 1851 design, using one-third the wire and generating a significantly greater effect.

Hearder was the inventor in 1842 of a magnetometer, which he created with the object of ascertaining the rate of magnetic development in iron. This development also earned him a silver medal from the Polytechnic Society.

Hearder was an early advocate of the practicality of laying intercontinental submarine telegraph cables. He was asked to consult on the Atlantic Cable, circa 1850, and proposed an improved design which used gutta percha as an insulator, a design which he later patented and a modified version of which was ultimately used in that project. He was later consulted again when the cable was stored at Keyham Dock in Plymouth over the winter of 1857–58, after the failure of the first attempt to lay it August 1857 and before the (briefly) successful attempt in August 1858.

Hearder also invented several specialised forms of stove.

== Work on alternative experimental procedures ==
During his life Hearder developed many alternative experimental procedures which were usable by those with sight impairments. These procedures included steadily moving a paper strip through an induction coil's spark gap, enabling him to feel perforation holes and thus estimate the coil's frequency, which also sounded as an audible tone. In 1858, when Hearder was asked to advise on the faulty Atlantic Cable prior to the departure of the cable ship Agamenmnon from Plymouth's Keyham Dockyard, Hearder reported testing the cable by inserting his tongue into the 2500-mile-long circuit to determine the electrical resistance of the wire.

== Bibliography ==
Over the course of his career, Hearder published several books and pamphlets, including:

- On some new statical and thermal effects of the induction coil, with a new instrument for registering a rapid succession of electrical discharges, and a comparison of the effects of the induction coil with those of frictional and hydro-electric machines (1856), self-published
- On the difference in the amount of electricity developed by equal surfaces of cylinder and plate electrical machines (1858), self-published
- The degeneration of our sea fisheries (1870), self-published
- Guide to sea fishing and the rivers of South Devon: and descriptive catalogue of his prize river and sea fishing tackle, cricket, archery, croquet, &c., &c (1873), self-published

== See also ==
- Elizabeth Cavicchi, "Blind Experimenting in a Sighted World: The Electrical Innovations of Jonathan Nash Hearder", Proceedings of the Plymouth Athenaeum, X, 2004/2007, 39–48.
