= Volta Prize =

Historical science award by the French government

The Volta Prize (French: prix Volta) was originally established by Napoleon III during the Second French Empire in 1852 to honor Alessandro Volta, an Italian physicist noted for developing the electric battery. This international prize awarded 50,000 French francs to extraordinary scientific discoveries related to electricity. The prize was instituted by the Ministry of Public Instruction with the personal funding of the French Emperor, the selection committee was usually constituted by members of the French Academy of Sciences.

Notable recipients have included, Heinrich Ruhmkorff, who commercialised the induction coil, and Zénobe Gramme, inventor of the Gramme dynamo and the first practical electric motor used in industry.

One of its most notable awards was made in 1880, when Alexander Graham Bell received the fourth edition of the Volta Prize for the invention of the telephone. Among the committee members who judged were Victor Hugo and Alexandre Dumas, fils. Since Bell was himself becoming more affluent, he used the prize money to create institutions in and around Washington, D.C., including the prestigious Volta Laboratory Association in 1880 (also known as the 'Volta Laboratory' and as the 'Alexander Graham Bell Laboratory') precursor to Bell Labs, with his endowment fund (the 'Volta Fund'), and then in 1887 the 'Volta Bureau', which later became the Alexander Graham Bell Association for the Deaf and Hard of Hearing (AG Bell).

The prize was discontinued in 1888.

== Inspiration ==
=== Galvanism Prize ===
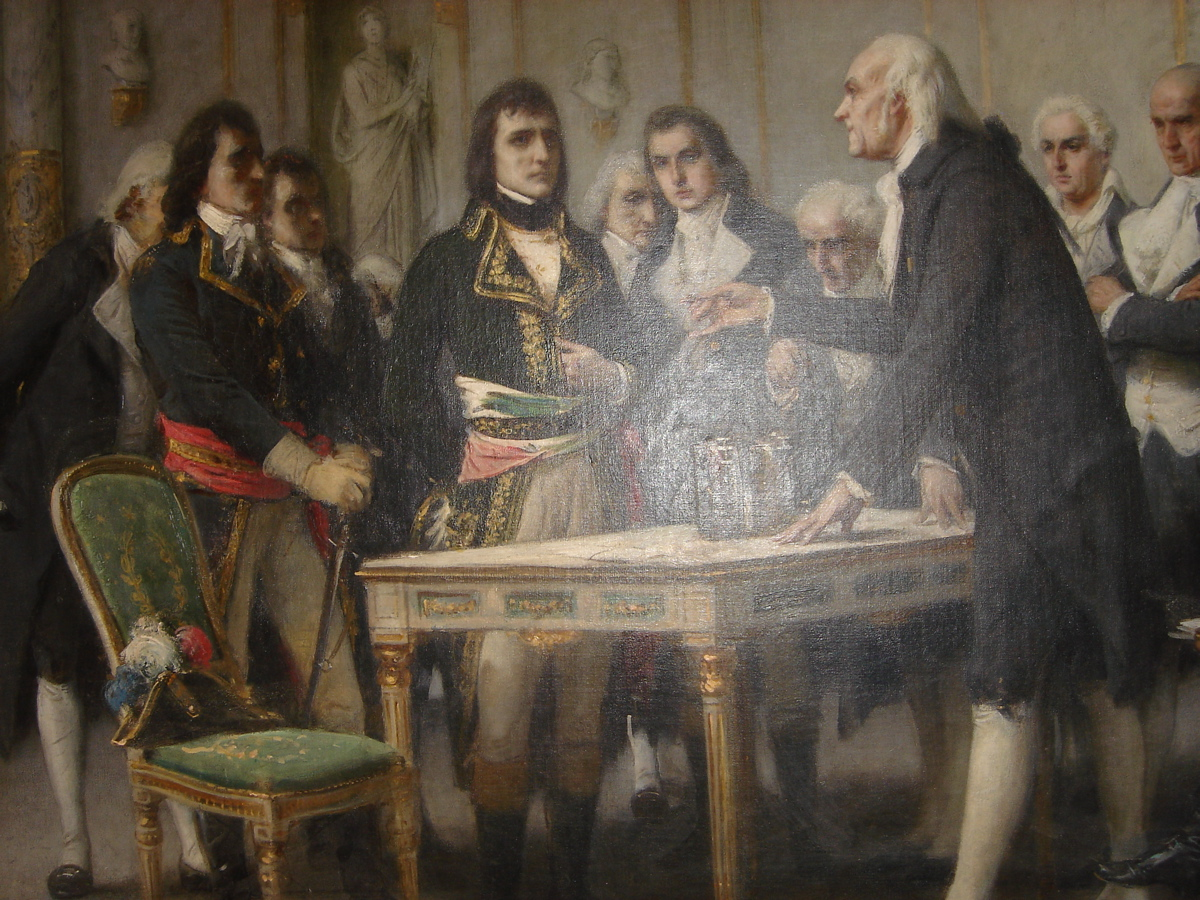
Volta explains the principle of the "electric column" to Napoleon in 1801

The Volta prize was inspired on the earlier French Academy of Sciences Galvanism Prize (French: Prix du galvanisme) created by Napoleon Bonaparte in 1801. A Grand Prize of 60,000 francs and a medal of 30,000 francs to be given for discoveries similar to those of Volta and Benjamin Franklin. The Grand Prize never found a deserving recipient.

Only four recipients received a secondary reward of 30,000 francs from the Galvanism Prize:

- 1806 Paul Erman.
- 1807 Sir Humphry Davy.
- 1809 Shared between Joseph Louis Gay-Lussac and Baron Louis Jacques Thénard.

=== Napoleon III interest in science ===
Additionally, the founder of the Volta prize and next Emperor of the French, Louis-Napoléon Bonaparte (Napoleon III), nephew of Bonaparte, was himself very invested in the development of electric science. He presented his own voltaic pile at the French Academy of Sciences in 1843, made out of a single metal and two acid solutions.

== Nomination rules and prize ==
The rules of the Volta Prize were decreed by Napoleon III in Paris, on 23 February 1852. The decree contains five articles:

- Article 1: A prize of 50,000 French francs to be awarded to new applications of the voltaic pile in the fields of industry and heat sources, public lightning, chemistry, mechanics, and/or medicine. (Note: Original French article: Un prix de cinquante mille francs est institué en faveur de l'auteur de la découverte qui rendra la pile de Volta applicable avec économie: Soit à l'industrie, comme source de chaleur; soit à l'éclairage; soit à la Chimie; soit à la Mécanique; soit à la Médecine pratique)
- Article 2: Scientists and inventors from all nationalities are admitted in the competition. (Note: Original French article: Les savants de toutes les nations sont admis à concourir.)
- Article 3: The prize is open to claim for five years. (Note: Original French article: Le concours demeurera ouvert pendant cinq ans.)
- Article 4: A committee is to be established to analyse the breakthrough of each of the contestants and to recognize if it fills the necessary conditions. (Note: Original French article: Il sera nommé une Commission chargée d'examiner la découverte de chacun des concurrents et de reconnaître si elle remplit les conditions requises.)
- Article 5: The Ministers of France are in charge of the execution of the present decree. (Note: Original French article: Les Ministres sont chargées, chacun en ce qui le concerne, de l'exécution du présent décret.)

The articles descriptions above are not a literal translation from the original French articles.

The sum of money, 50,000 francs, was approximately $10,000 US dollars at that time (about $340,000 in current dollars), more than five times the annual salary of a Paris Faculty Professor at that time. Between the members of the committee, Edmond Becquerel and Jean-Baptiste Dumas were known to be reporters in certain editions.

== Recipients ==
All the Volta Prize editions are listed below:

- 1858 No prize awarded. Honorary medals were awarded to Heinrich Ruhmkorff, Paul-Gustave Froment and Duchenne de Boulogne.
- 1863 Heinrich Ruhmkorff, for developing the Ruhmkorff coil.
- 1871 No prize awarded.
- 1880 Alexander Graham Bell, for invention of the telephone. A secondary prize of 20,000 francs was awarded to Zénobe Gramme.
- 1888 Zénobe Gramme, for his labours in introducing and perfecting the continuous-current dynamo.

Other minor recognitions were also given to Paul-Gustave Froment for the electric motor, to Auguste Achard for the electric brake, to Gaetan Bonelli for the electric loom, to David Edward Hughes for the printing telegraph, to Giovanni Caselli for the pantelegraph, to Victor Serrin for his lightning system, to Leopold Oudry for galvanoplasty, to Duchenne de Boulogne for the applications of electricity in medicine, to Gaston Planté for a development of a secondary battery, and to Ernest Onimus for his research on electric currents.

== See also ==
- Alexander Graham Bell honors and tributes
- Edison Volta Prize
- List of physics awards
