= Charles Grafton Page =

American scientist (1812–1866)

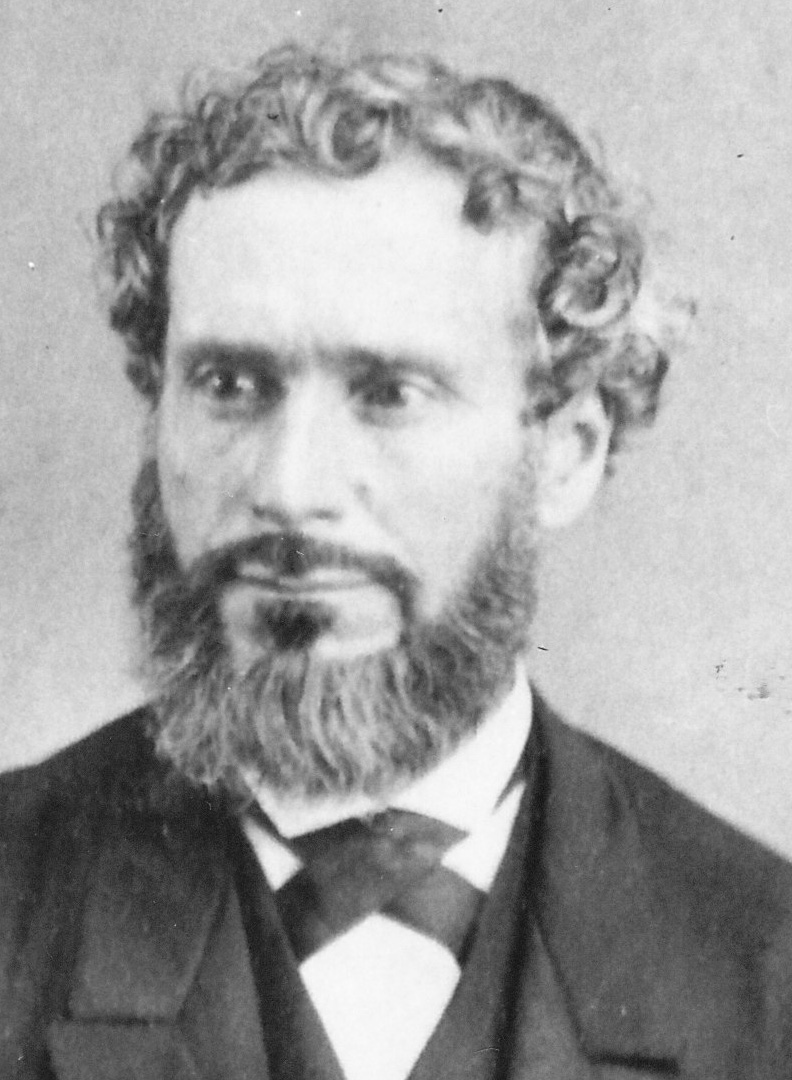
- Charles Grafton Page
- Born: 25 January 1812; Salem, Massachusetts, US
- Died: 5 May 1868 (aged 56); Washington D.C., US
- Education: Harvard College; Harvard Medical School
- Known for: origins of induction coil origins of circuit breakers electromagnetic locomotive
- Scientific career
- Fields: Electromagnetism
- Workplaces: US Patent Office; Columbian College (George Washington University)

Charles Grafton Page (January 25, 1812 – May 5, 1868) was an American electrical experimenter and inventor, medical doctor, patent examiner, patent advocate, and professor of chemistry.

Like his more famous contemporaries Michael Faraday and Joseph Henry, Page began his career as an astute natural philosopher who developed innovative work with natural phenomena through direct observation and experimenting. Toward the later part of their careers, the science of the day had moved on to a more mathematical emphasis in which these scientists did not participate.

Through his exploratory experiments and distinctive inventions, Page developed a deep understanding of electromagnetism. He applied this understanding in the service of the US Patent Office, in support of other inventors, and in pursuing his own ill-fated dream of electromagnetic locomotion. His work had a lasting impact on telegraphy and in the practice and politics of patenting scientific innovation, challenging the rising scientific elitism that maintained 'the scientific do not patent'.

== Family life ==
Charles Grafton Page was born to Captain Jere Lee Page and Lucy Lang Page on January 25, 1812 in Salem, Massachusetts. Having eight siblings, four of each gender, he was the only one of five sons to pursue a career into mature adulthood. One of his brothers died in infancy. Brother George died from typhoid at age sixteen, brother Jery perished on a sea expedition to the Caribbean at age twenty-five, and Henry, afflicted by poliomyelitis, was not able to support himself. In writing to Charles Grafton during his final voyage, Jery expressed the family's hope for his success: "You are the only classical Page in our book."

Page's curiosity about electricity was evident from childhood. At age nine, he climbed on top of his parents' house with a fire-shovel in an attempt to catch electricity during a thunderstorm. At age ten, he built an electrostatic machine that he used to shock his friends. At sixteen, Page developed the "portable electrophorus", which served as the foundation for his first published article in the American Journal of Science (Page, 1834).

Other early interests, including botany, entomology (Page, 1836b), and floriculture, contributed to his scientific training and later avocations.

After graduating from medical school, Page continued to reside in his parents' Salem home and opened a small medical practice. In a well-stocked lab that he set up there, he experimented with electricity, demonstrated effects that no one had observed before, and improvised original apparatus that amplified these effects.

When his father retired from a successful career as a sea captain in trade with East India, Page joined his family in relocating to rural Virginia outside Washington, D.C.

Page married Priscilla Sewall Webster in 1844. Priscilla was the younger sister of the wife of a Washington physician, Harvey Lindsly, who was among Page's colleagues. One son died in infancy. The couple brought up three sons and two daughters. Their oldest daughter, Emelyn or Emmie, died less than a year before Page's own death. Their youngest son, Harvey Lindsly Page (1859–1934), was named for his uncle. He was a famous American architect and inventor, of San Antonio, Texas.

Page pursued undergraduate studies at Harvard College from 1828 to 1832, studying chemistry under Professor John White Webster. A classmate at Salem Latin School who also attended college and medical school with him, Henry Wheatland described Page as popular, fun-loving, athletic, a fine singer and "a loved companion". Page participated in organizing a college chemical club where he demonstrated electricity and other phenomena. He received an M.D. from Harvard Medical School in 1836.

== Career ==
After receiving an M.D. in 1836, he practiced medicine and gave public lectures on chemistry in Salem. When Page moved to northern Virginia in 1838, he continued his experimental research and set up a medical practice which he sustained for several years.

Page served as a patent examiner in the United States Patent Office in Washington, D.C. for two periods: 1842-1852 and 1861-1868. He became senior patent examiner during his first term. During the years intervening, he took up a business as a patent agent or solicitor to help other inventors secure patents, established and edited the short-lived The American Polytechnic Journal, and pursued his own interests in electromagnetism, floriculture and other areas. As a patent agent, Page handled up to 50 successful patents a year, including patents for Eben Norton Horsford, Walter Hunt and others. Page's 1861 return to the Patent Agency as an examiner occurred in the wake of numerous dismissals of patent office employees under the new Administration of Abraham Lincoln.

Page figured as a key witness in the Morse v. O'Reilly telegraph lawsuit of 1848. However, when Morse sought an extension of his patent on telegraph apparatus twelve years later, Page refuted Morse's role as inventor and was perhaps influential in the extensions' denial.

From 1844 to 1849, Page was professor of chemistry and pharmacy in the Medical Department at Columbian College in Washington, D.C. (now George Washington University). He held other public roles such as that of advising the choice of stone to be used in constructing the Smithsonian Institution and the Washington Monument to the committees in charge of these projects.

Throughout his life, Page published more than one-hundred articles over the course of three distinct periods: the late 1830s, the mid-1840s, and the early 1850s. The first period (1837–1840) was especially crucial in developing his analytic skills. Over 40 of his articles appeared in the American Journal of Science edited by Benjamin Silliman; some of these were reprinted at the time in William Sturgeon's Annals of Electricity, Magnetism, and Chemistry printed in Great Britain. The Royal Society Catalogue of Scientific Papers (1800–1863 volume) records many of Page's papers, however this listing is incomplete, as is that provided in (Post, 1976a, p. 207-213). He died in Washington DC in 1868

== Scientific accomplishments ==
While still a medical student at Harvard, Page conducted a ground-breaking experiment which demonstrated the presence of electricity in an arrangement of a spiral conductor that no one had tried before. His experiment was a response to a short paper by Joseph Henry, announcing that a strong electric shock was obtained from a ribbon strip of copper, spiralled up between fabric insulation, at the moment when battery current stopped running in this conductor. These strong shocks manifested the electrical property of self-inductance which Faraday had identified in researches published prior to Henry's, building on his own landmark discovery of electromagnetic induction. Page seemed to be unaware of Faraday's analysis.

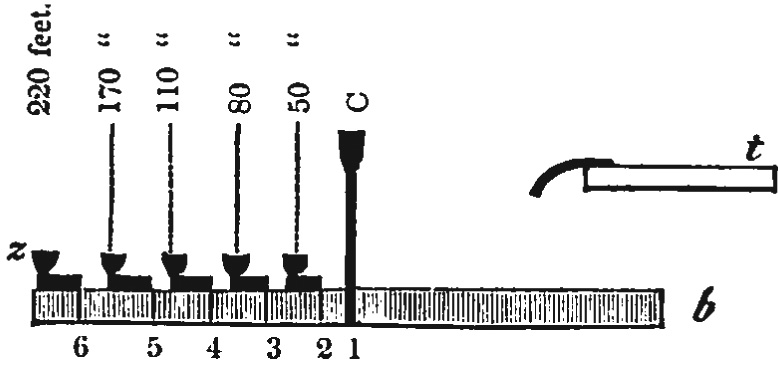
Side view of Page's 1837 spiral, showing connector cups spaced across its length.

Page's innovation was to construct a spiral conductor having cups filled with mercury as electrical connectors that were placed at various positions along its length. He then connected one terminal from an electrochemical battery to the inner cup of the spiral, and put the other battery terminal into some other cup of the spiral. The direct battery current flowed through the spiral, from cup to cup. He held a metal wand in each hand, and put these wands into the same two cups as where the battery terminals went — or any other pair of cups. When an assistant removed one of the battery terminals, stopping the current from going in the spiral, Page received a shock. He reported stronger shocks when his hands covered more of the spiral's length than where direct battery current went. He even felt shocks from parts of the spiral where no direct battery current passed. He used acupuncture needles, pierced into his fingers, to amplify his sense of shock.

While Page advocated the use of this shocking device as a medical treatment, an early form of electrotherapy, his own interest lay in its heightening of electrical tension, or voltage above that of the low voltage battery input, and in its other electrical behaviors. Page went on to improve the instrument, giving it the name 'Dynamic Multiplier'.

In order for Page's instrument to produce the shock, the battery current had to be stopped. In order to experience another shock, the battery had to be started again, and then stopped. Page invented the first interrupters, to provide a repeatable means of connecting and disconnecting the circuit. In these devices, electrical flow is started and stopped as a rocking or rotary motion lifts electrical contacts out of a mercury pool. An electric motor effect is responsible for the continued operation of the switch.

Crucial to Page's research with the spiral conductor was his capacity to explore and question the unknown, where the physical effects were enigmatic and the 'received theories' inadequate. Page did not provide an explanation for what he found, yet he extended and amplified the apparatus and its unexpected behaviors. A recent reconstruction of Page's experiment corroborates the central role of ambiguity in his work, finding, "A key strategy in working productively with ambiguity lies in opening up multiple possibilities, entry points, and perspectives, as Page did by soldering intermediate [cups] into his spiral." Page's publication about his spiral instrument was well received in the American science community and in England, putting him into the upper ranks of American science at the time.

British experimenter William Sturgeon reprinted Page's article in his journal Annals of Electricity. Sturgeon provided an analysis of the electromagnetic effect involved; Page drew on and expanded Sturgeon's analysis in his own later work. Sturgeon devised coils that were adaptations of Page's instrument, where battery current flowed through one, inner, segment of a coil, and electrical shock was taken from the entire length of a coil.

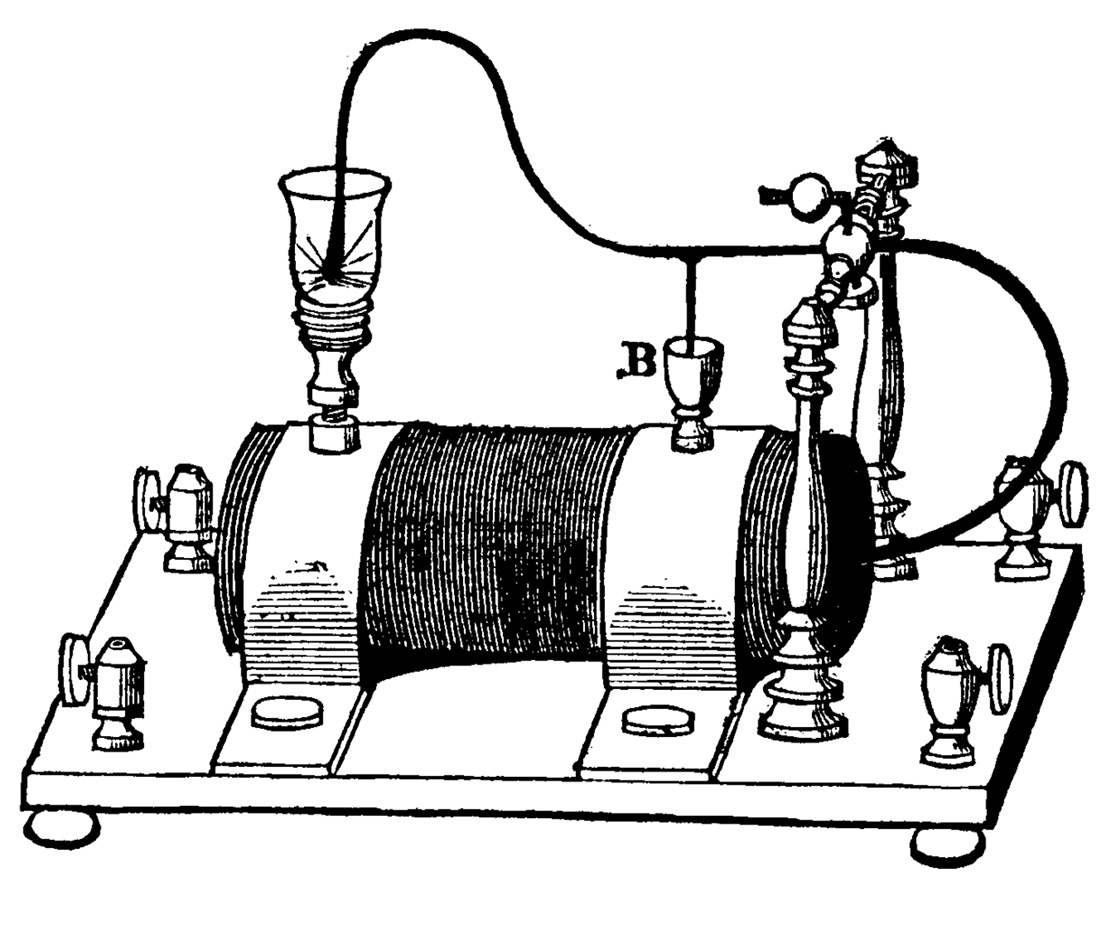
Charles Grafton Page's double helix coil, as marketed in 1848 for $8.00 by Boston instrument maker Daniel Davis Jr.

Through the input from Sturgeon, as well as his own continuing researches, Page developed coil instruments that were the foundation for the eventual induction coil. These instruments had two wires. One wire, termed the primary, carried battery current; a shock was taken across the ends of the other much longer wire, termed the secondary (see transformer). The primary wire was wound concentrically over an iron core; the secondary was wound over that. Page developed a deep understanding of the underlying behaviors. In Page's published account of his coil, he termed it and its contact breaker the 'Compound Electro-Magnet and Electrotome'. Page's patent model for this coil is on display at the National Museum of American History.

In a subsequent experiment with a spiral conductor, Page mounted it rigidly between the poles of a suspended horseshoe magnet. When current stopped flowing in the spiral, a tone could be heard from the magnet, which Page termed 'galvanic music'. Thirty years later, Alexander Graham Bell cited Page's galvanic music as an important precedent for his development of telephony.

An astute observer and exploratory experimenter, Page invented many other electromagnetic devices. Some of these involved the electromagnetic motor effect in original ways. Many prototypes devised by Page were turned into products manufactured and marketed by Boston instrument-maker Daniel Davis, Jr., the first American to specialize in magnetic philosophical instruments.

While consulting with Samuel F.B. Morse and Alfred Lewis Vail on the development of telegraph apparatus and techniques, Page contributed to the adoption of suspended wires using a ground return, designed a signal receiver magnet and tested a magneto as a source to substitute for the battery.

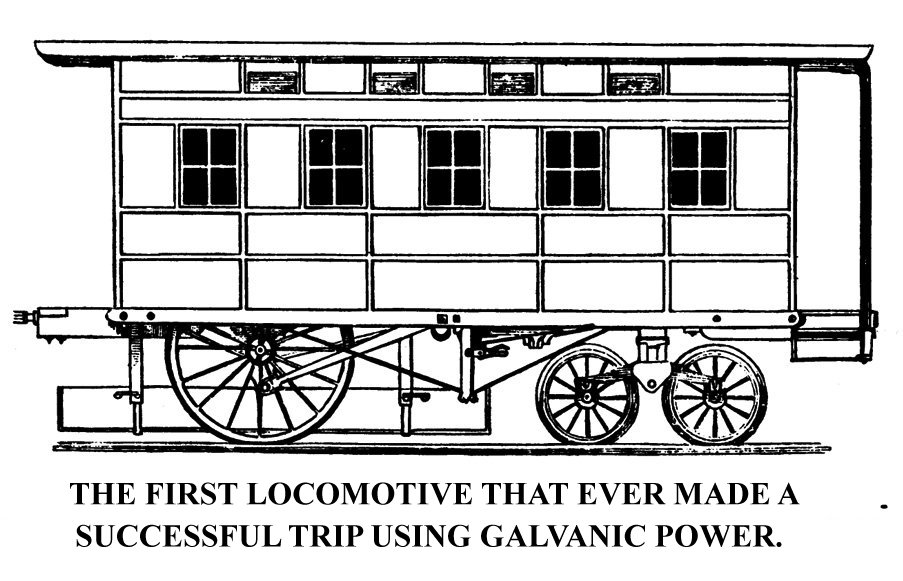
Charles Grafton Page's electromagnetic locomotive.

During the 1840s, Page developed what he termed the Axial Engine. This instrument used an electromagnetic solenoid coil to draw an iron rod into its hollow interior. The rod's displacement opened a switch that stopped current from flowing in the coil; then being unattracted, the rod reverted out of the coil, and this cycle repeated again. The resulting reciprocating motion of the rod back and forth, into and out of the coil, was converted to rotary motion by the mechanism. After demonstrating uses of this engine to run saws and pumps, Page successfully petitioned the U.S. Senate for funds to produce an electromagnetic locomotive, based on this design.

With these funds plus personal resources that took him into debt, Page built and tested the first full-sized electromagnetic locomotive, preceded only by the 1842 battery-powered model-sized Galvani of Scottish inventor Robert Davidson. Along the way, Page constructed a series of motors, revisions of the axial engine having different dimensions and mechanical features, which he tested thoroughly. The motor operated on large electrochemical cells, acid batteries having as electrodes zinc and costly platinum, with fragile clay diaphragms between the cells. Page's 1850 American Association for the Advancement of Science presentation about his progress impressed Joseph Henry, Benjamin Silliman and other leading scientists.

On April 29, 1851, Page boosted its motors from 8 to 20 HP power. Page conducted a full test, intending to run the 21,000 pound locomotive from Washington DC to Baltimore and back with passengers on board, but problems immediately arose. High voltage sparks, resulting from the effect Page had investigated with the spiral conductor, broke through the insulation of the electrical coils, resulting in short circuits. Many of the battery's fragile clay dividers cracked on starting up; others broke down during operation. Page and his mechanic Ari Davis struggled to make repairs and keep the locomotive running. With some periods of steady running, the nearly silent engine traveled 5 miles (8.0 km) to Bladensburg, Maryland, at a top speed of 19 miles per hour (31 km/h). Page reversed direction there, for what was an arduous, calamity-laced return to the National Capitol.

The failures of Page's electromagnetic locomotive test run were cautionary to other inventors who eventually found other means than batteries to produce electrically driven locomotion. Before Page began his attempt, work such as that of James Prescott Joule had generated a general consensus among scientists that "the battery powered motor was a hopelessly impractical device". Page had disregarded those findings. He himself never gave up believing in the practical potential of his design.

== Unmasking pseudoscience ==
Comfortable himself in public performance as a popular lecturer and singer, being skilled in ventriloquism as well, Page was astute in detecting the misuse of performative acts in defrauding a gullible public. One class of fraudulent schemes prevalent at the time involved communications with spirits by means of rapping sounds, the motion of a table, or other such signs produced in the vicinity of the perpetrator-medium. The sounds and motions were attributed to occult forces and forms of electricity. The Fox sisters, of Rochester New York, made these claims notorious by exhibiting in public and private settings, while collecting money from their audiences.

Investigating some of these performers in person, Page produced a book that exposes various means of deception they employed. He described his analysis of these techniques during a sitting with the Fox sisters. Each time a critical observer peered under the table around which the sisters were seated, the spirit rapping ceased; whenever the observer sat upright, the sounds recommenced. Page asked to have the spirit sounds displayed elsewhere than via the table. One sister climbed into a wardrobe closet. Page identified where her long dress (concealing a stick or other apparatus) contacted the wardrobe. Through his expert knowledge of ventriloquism, Page detected how this performer was misdirecting the viewer's attention away from the actual source of the sound while building expectations to suppose the sound came from elsewhere than the source. However the trick was "poorly done" and the girl could not control it so as to produce any spirit communication.

Going on to reveal other fraudulent practices, Page addressed the relationship at work between performer and audience by which both functioned as perpetrators:

The prime movers in all these marvels are ''impostors'', and their disciples, ''dupes''. While the former are filling their coffers at the expense of the latter, they must often indulge in secret merriment at the credulity of their adherents, and particularly at the grave discussions of the learned clergy and others upon electricity, magnetism the new fluid... or the devil's immediate agency.... The instant the idea of the superhuman gets possession of the mind all fitness for investigation and power of analysis begins to vanish, and credulity swells to its utmost capacity. The most glaring inconsistencies and absurdities are not discerned and are swallowed whole....

Page's efforts to expose these frauds at their human roots stems in part from his keen concern for furthering the public understanding of science and their proficient use of its findings and benefits. In this undertaking, Page allied with contemporary Michael Faraday and other scientists who have sought to debunk the unscrupulous applications of pseudoscience upon a willing and gullible public.

== Controversy and impact from politics, war, and patents ==
As with the challenge to spiritualism described above, Page's scientific undertakings brought him into public arenas where politics and controversy held sway. Eloquent, combative, keen-minded and persistent, Page made his commitments known. Increasingly, Page's self-chosen and sometimes self-serving commitments diverged from the norms of behavior sanctioned by society and the elitism of the emerging professionalist trend in science. The resulting tarnish to Page's reputation impacted him during his lifetime and contributed to the longstanding historical neglect of his scientific work and personal story, thereby reducing general understanding of the complexity of the American experience in science.

A tension early to arise in his career as patent examiner was that of the conflict of interest between the privileged information he had regarding applicants' patents, and his private consulting with particular inventors on the side. Following his appearance in the 1848 Morse v O'Reilly lawsuit over the telegraph, Page took a more careful stance in his role as patent examiner. Thereafter, he refrained from transmitting such privileged information to rival patent applicants.

However, the well-paid public post of patent examiner put the occupants continually under scrutiny by politicians, scientists, and aspiring inventors. Both Congress and the executive branch exerted control and influence over policy and practices in the patent office.

In the early years of the United States Patent and Trademark Office, a patent examiner was expected to be highly trained, knowledgeable in all the sciences, informed on current and past technology. Page was an exemplar of this ideal.

As Page continued in the job, the number of patents submitted to the agency increased sharply, while the number of patents granted was the same or less, and the number of patent examiners was unchanged. Inventors seeking patents, becoming incensed about decisions made against them, coalesced into a lobby with a voice projected through the journal Scientific American. This lobby advocated "liberalization" — more leniency in the granting of patents, giving the inventor the "benefit of the doubt"— and argued against the scientific research being sponsored by the Smithsonian Institution under Joseph Henry.

Henry took a hard line, decrying inventors' "futile attempts to innovate and improve". The elite professionalized science that Henry was building up through the Smithsonian and other organizations treated as low status the having or seeking of a patent; patents were not considered a contribution to science. While Page set out to show that gaining patents was genuine scientific work, he fell out of favor with the scientific establishment. His friendship with Henry petered out, and Page was no longer held in high regard as part of elite science.

Page shifted in his position on the granting of patents. As an examiner of patents, he was scrupulous and fair. Through his own experience as an inventor and association with other inventors, he allied with their concerns. On his resignation from the patent agency, Page used the journal he founded and edited as a forum to critique and even lambast the agency and policies which he had upheld for 10 years prior.

Having had much to do with shaping policy from inside the (patent) office, he also played a crucial role in reshaping it from the outside(Post, 1976a, p. 151).

Following the example of Samuel Morse, who developed the telegraph to commercial viability through assistance from federal government funds, Page sought a similar level of support for his electromagnetically powered locomotive. He found a political ally in Thomas Hart Benton, senator from Missouri. Benton's passionate rhetoric on behalf of Page's vision was instrumental in securing unanimous support for a Senate allocation of $20,000 to fund Page's project through the Department of Navy. By the end of that year (1849), Page reported to the Navy that he was collaborating on the project with a mechanic, Ari Davis, the brother of Daniel Davis Jr., but had nothing yet to show. In print, inventor Thomas Davenport (inventor) challenged the expenditure of public funds on Page's project, claiming that motors he had already invented and built were equal to the task. Page defused that objection by publishing a statement about his unique device.

More troubles ensued for the project. Running low on cash, Page asked for more. Speaking in the Senate in the summer of 1850, Benton presented Page's attainment of a force an order of magnitude greater than what the same battery had output under his initial trials. Benton upped the stakes by requesting funds for Page to develop an electromagnetically powered ship of war. This second petition met with serious opposition in the Senate. Senator Henry Stuart Foote countered that Page had not proved substantial progress or benefits from his work. Senator Jefferson Finis Davis objected to the appropriation of government funds to one inventor, while other inventors such as Thomas Davenport went unsupported. Both the US Senate and House nixed any further funds for Page's project. In order to prepare the locomotive for its 1851 trial run, Page went over $6000 into debt. In the wake of the failed public test of this locomotive, Page faced a critical press. Gaining no assistance from the world of finance, he emerged from the debacle in "desperate straights, financially and emotionally".

The American Civil War wreaked a further devastating impact on Page's scientific work and legacy. In 1863, Union soldiers stationed in the area of Page's home, broke into his laboratory as a random, unprovoked act of violence. His equipment, inventions and laboratory notebooks were destroyed. Some other inventions by Page which he had donated to the Smithsonian Institution were destroyed by a fire there in 1865. As a result of these destructive events, very few of Page's handmade devices exist today. With little remaining of his experimental work and notes, Page's many contributions have slipped from the view of most historians.

Suffering debt, terminal illness and isolation from the mainstream scientific community by his last years, Page contrived one final effort to secure credit and status for his achievements. In 1867, he petitioned the United States Congress for a retrospective patent on his inventions of the late 1830s: the spiral conductor, the circuit breakers, the double helical coil. The granting of such a patent transgressed such policies as that an invention in widespread public use for decades can not be patented, and that an employee of the Patent office can not hold a patent. Page circumvented these policies by appealing to nationalism. To support his argument, he published anonymously a lengthy, closely researched yet self-promoting book titled The American Claim to the Induction Coil and its electrostatic Developments.

By the 1860s, the induction coil was becoming a prominent instrument of physics research. Instrument-makers in America, Great Britain and the European continent contributed in developing the construction and operation of induction coils. Premiere among these instrument makers was Heinrich Daniel Ruhmkorff, who in 1864 received from Emperor Napoleon III the prestigious Volta Prize along with a 50,000 franc award for his 'invention' of the induction coil. Page maintained that the devices he developed in the 1830s were not markedly different from the induction coil and that other American inventors had filled in with improvements that were better than anything made by Ruhmkorff — and alleging that Ruhmkorff had plagiarized the coil of another American instrument-maker, Edward Samuel Ritchie.

A special act passed by the U.S. House and Senate, and signed by President Andrew Johnson authorized what was later dubbed "The Page Patent". Page died a few weeks later, in May 1868. Instead of dying with him, the Page patent went on to play a major role in the politics and economics of the telegraph industry. Page's lawyer and heirs successfully argued that the patent covered the mechanisms involved in "all known forms of telegraphy". An interest in the patent was sold to the Western Union Co; together Western Union and the Page heirs reaped lucrative benefits. Page's patent secured a life 'in style' for his widow and heirs. Although he was no longer living, it figured as yet another violation, on his part, of the behavior code under the emerging professionalization of science of the day, under which science was to be conducted for its own sake, without accruing apparent political or financial gain.

== Selected publications ==
=== Books ===
- Psychomancy : Spirit-Rppings and Table-Tippings Exposed. New-York: D. Appleton and Company, 1853.
- A Memorial to the Congress of the United States. Washington DC: Polkinhorn & Son, 1867.
- The American Claim to the Induction Coil and its electrostatic developments. Washington DC: Intelligencer Printing House, 1867.

=== Articles ===
- "Notice of New Electrical Instruments". American Journal of Science, 26 (1834) p. 110-112.
- "Medical Application of Galvanism"". Boston Medical and Surgical Journal (June 22, 1836) p. 333.
- "Insect Dissections". Boston Medical and Surgical Journal (July 13, 1836) pp. 364–365.
- "Method of Increasing Shocks, and Experiments, with Prof. Henry's apparatus for obtaining sparks and shocks from the Calorimotor". American Journal of Science, vol. 31, pp. 137–141; reprinted in Annals of Electricity, vol. 1 (1837), pp. 290–294.
- "On the Use of the Dynamic Multiplier, with a New Accompanying Apparatus". American Journal of Science, 32 (1837) pp. 354–360.
- "The Production of Galvanic Music". American Journal of Science, 32 (1837), pp. 396–397.
- "Experiments in Electromagnetism". American Journal of Science, 33 (1838), pp. 118–120.
- "New Magnetic Electrical Machine of Great Power". American Journal of Science, 34 B (1838), pp. 163–9.
- "Researches in Magnetic Electricity and New Magnetic Electrical Instruments". American Journal of Science, 34 (1838) pp. 364–373.
- "Magneto-Electric and Electro-Magnetic Apparatus and Experiments". American Journal of Science, 35 (1839), pp. 252–268.

=== Patents ===
- "Head Rest". U.S. Patent 20,507.
- "Induction Coil Apparatus and Circuit Breaker ", U.S. Patent 76,654.
