= Ritchie Rock =

Rock in Antarctica

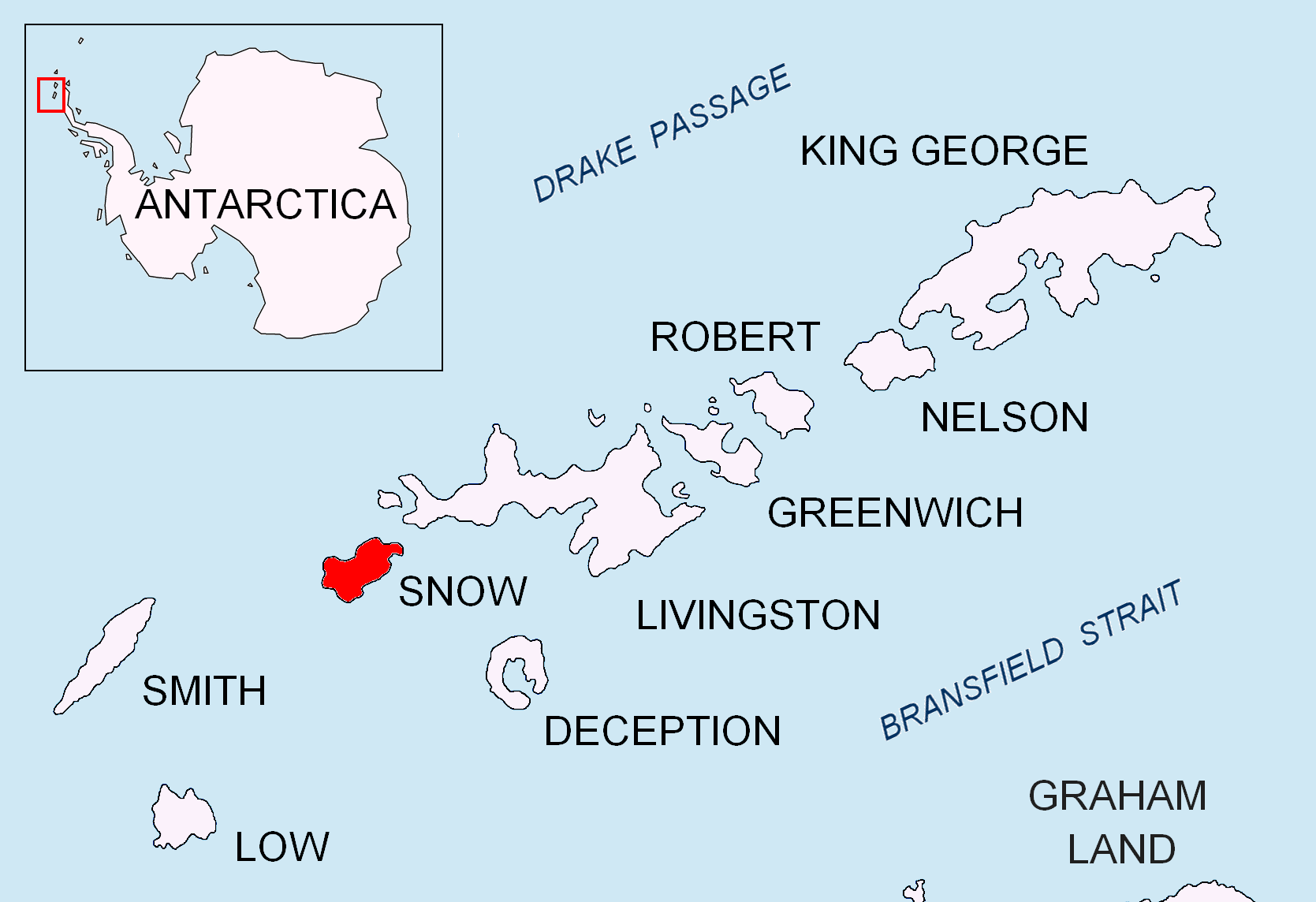
- Location of Snow Island in the South Shetland Islands

- Location within Antarctica Location within South Shetland Islands

Geography
- Location: Antarctica
- Coordinates: 62°51′03″S 61°22′35.5″W
- Archipelago: South Shetland Islands
- Area: 0.17 ha (0.42 acres)
- Length: 80 m (260 ft)
- Width: 73 m (240 ft)

Administration
- Administered under the Antarctic Treaty

Demographics
- Population: uninhabited

Topographic map of Livingston, Greenwich, Robert, Snow and Smith Islands

Ritchie Rock (Bulgarian: скала Ричи, romanized: skala Ritchie, IPA: [skɐˈla ˈrit͡ʃi]) is the conspicuous rock off the southwest coast of Snow Island in the South Shetland Islands, Antarctica extending 80 m in south–north direction and 73 m in west–east direction, with a surface area of 0.17 ha. The vicinity was visited by early 19th century sealers.

The feature is named after Edward Samuel Ritchie (1814–1895), an American inventor and physicist who created a waterborne version of the theodolite used in harbour surveys; in association with other names in the area deriving from the early development or use of geodetic instruments and methods.

== Location ==
Ritchie Rock is located at 62°51′03″S 61°22′35.5″W, which is 2.6 km east-northeast of Tooth Rock, 2.84 km east-southeast of Cape Conway and 1.82 km south-southeast of Pazardzhik Point. Bulgarian mapping in 2009.

== See also ==
- List of Antarctic and subantarctic islands

== Maps ==
- South Shetland Islands. Scale 1:200000 topographic map. DOS 610 Sheet W 62 60. Tolworth, UK, 1968
- L. Ivanov. Antarctica: Livingston Island and Greenwich, Robert, Snow and Smith Islands. Scale 1:120000 topographic map. Troyan: Manfred Wörner Foundation, 2010. ISBN 978-954-92032-9-5 (First edition 2009. ISBN 978-954-92032-6-4)
- Antarctic Digital Database (ADD). Scale 1:250000 topographic map of Antarctica. Scientific Committee on Antarctic Research (SCAR). Since 1993, regularly upgraded and updated
