= Ritchie Building =

- U.S. National Register of Historic Places
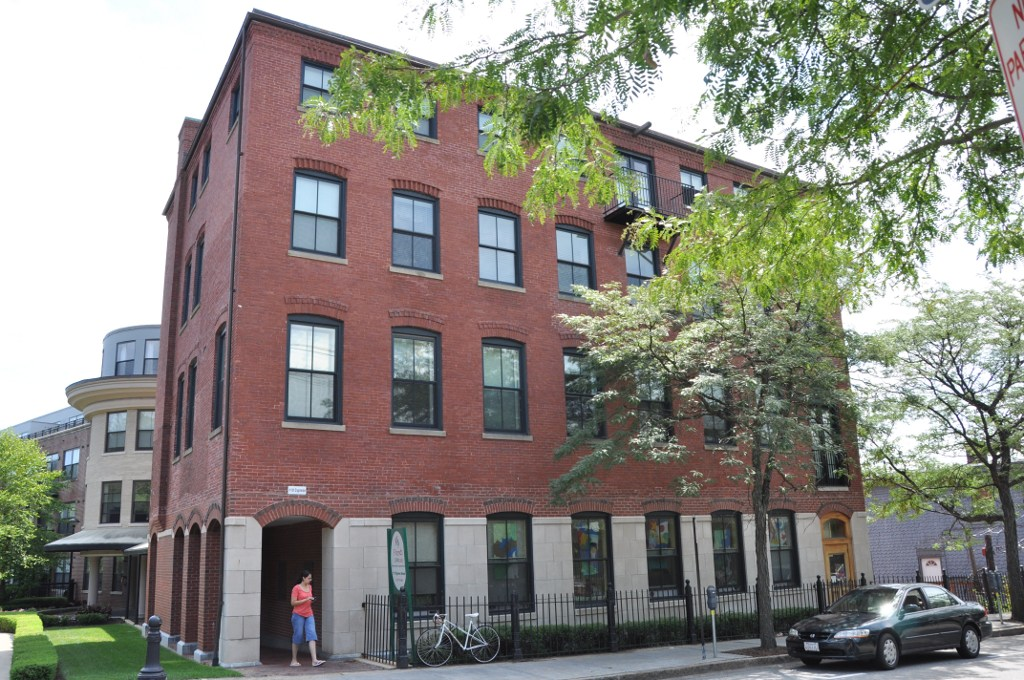

- Location within Massachusetts Location within the United States
- Location: 112 Cypress St., Brookline, Massachusetts
- Coordinates: 42.3310°N 71.1257°W
- Built: 1883
- Architectural style: Panel Brick
- MPS: Brookline MRA
- NRHP reference No.: 85003308
- Added to NRHP: October 17, 1985

The Ritchie Building is a historic industrial building at 112 Cypress Street in Brookline, Massachusetts. Built in 1883 by Edward Samuel Ritchie, it is a fine example of the Panel Brick style, and is further notable as the factory space in which Ritchie manufactured a nationally distributed line of navigational instruments. The building was listed on the National Register of Historic Places in 1985.

== Description and history ==
The Ritchie Building is located on the east side of Cypress Street, north of Massachusetts Route 9 and south of the MBTA Green Line D branch, just east of the Brookline Hills station. It is a four-story rectangular brick structure, with a hip roof. The first floor is below the street level, which was raised in order to bridge the railroad tracks, and the main entrance is now on the second level. The second level is finished in stone, resembling a raised basement level, while the upper floors retain their original modest Panel Brick features, including segmented-arch window openings and a corbelled cornice.

Edward Samuel Ritchie founded his navigational instruments company in the 1850s, and had, by the 1880s, established a main office in Boston and a manufacturing facility near Harvard Square in Cambridge. He built the present facility in 1883, not far from his home on Lincoln Street, when he was unable to expand the Cambridge space. It was one of the first industrial buildings to be built in Brookline. The business, whose customers notably included the United States Navy, was operated by Ritchie and his successors at this site until the 1950s. The building has since been rehabilitated for use as office space.

== See also ==
- National Register of Historic Places listings in Brookline, Massachusetts
