= Heinrich Daniel Ruhmkorff =

German instrument maker (1803–1877)

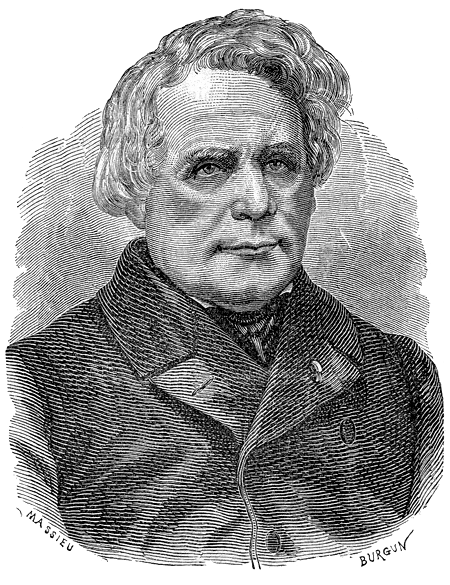
- Born: Heinrich Daniel Rühmkorff; 15 January 1803; Hanover, Electorate of Hanover, Holy Roman Empire
- Died: 20 December 1877 (aged 74); Paris, French Third Republic
- Resting place: Montparnasse Cemetery, Paris
- Known for: Ruhmkorff coil Ruhmkorff commutator
- Awards: Volta Prize (1858)

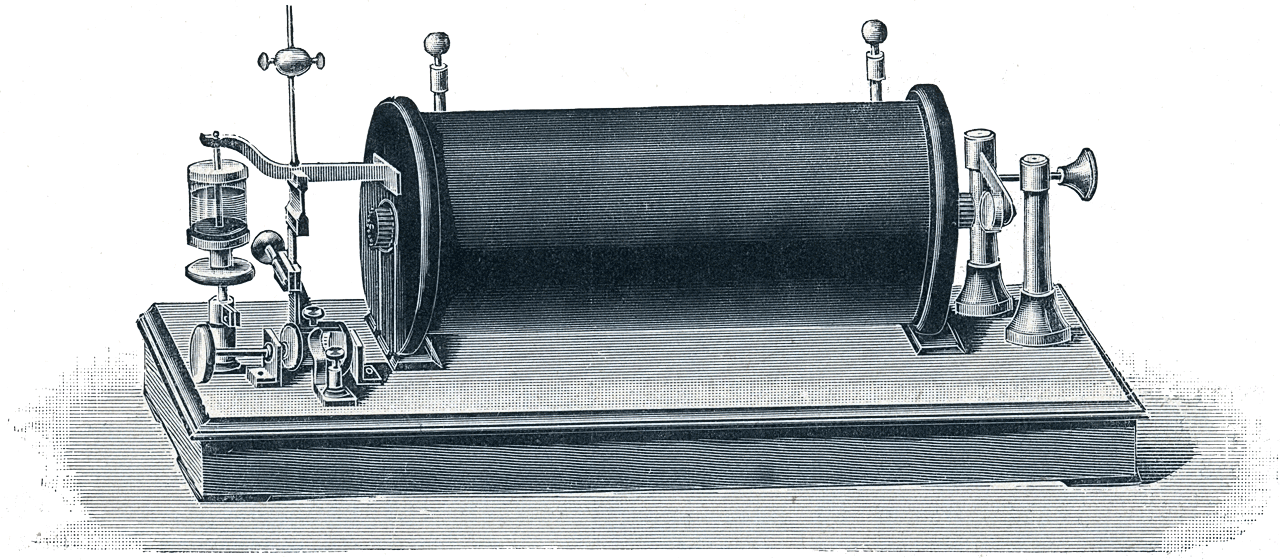
Ruhmkorff inductor

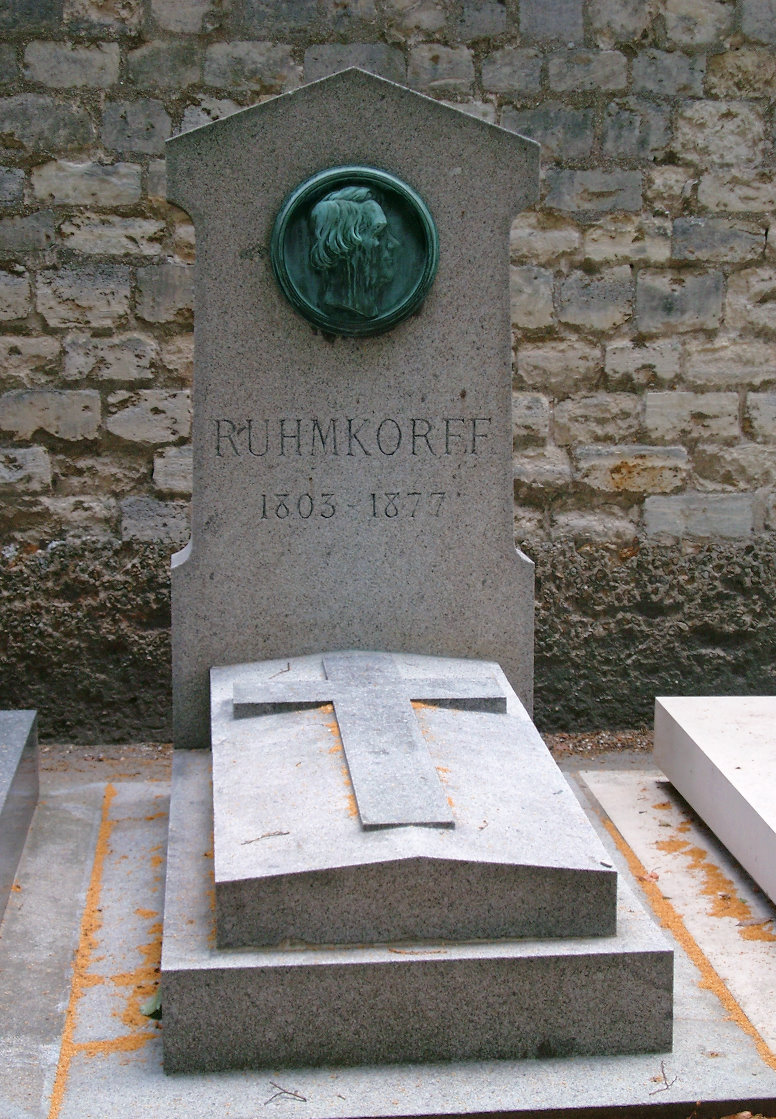
Tombstone of Heinrich Daniel Ruhmkorff on the Montparnasse Cemetery in Paris

Heinrich Daniel Rühmkorff (German: [ˈhaɪnʁɪç ˈdaːni̯ɛl ˈʁyːm.kɔʁf]; anglicized as Ruhmkorff; 15 January 1803 – 20 December 1877) was a German instrument maker who commercialised the induction coil (often referred to as the Ruhmkorff coil).

Ruhmkorff was born in Hanover. He changed the "ü" to "u" in his name when living abroad. After an apprenticeship with a German mechanic, he moved to England. Contemporaneous and extant biographies have made the assertion that he worked with the inventor Joseph Bramah, but this is unlikely since Bramah died in 1814. He may, though, have worked for the Bramah company. In 1855, he set up a shop in Paris, where he gained a reputation for the high quality of his electrical apparatus.

Although Ruhmkorff is often credited with the invention of the induction coil, it was in fact invented by Nicholas Callan in 1836. Ruhmkorff's first coil, which he patented in 1851, utilized long windings of copper wire to achieve a spark of approximately 2 inches (50 mm) in length. In 1857, after examining a greatly improved version made by an American inventor, Edward Samuel Ritchie, Ruhmkorff improved his design (as did other engineers), using glass insulation and other innovations to allow the production of sparks more than 30 centimetres long. Ruhmkorff patented the first version of his induction coil in 1851, and its success was such that in 1858 he becomes the first recipient of the Volta Prize, 50,000 French franc award by Napoleon III for one of the most important discoveries in the application of electricity. He died in Paris in 1877.

The Ruhmkorff lamps or 'Ruhmkorff's apparatus' mentioned in several of Jules Verne's science-fiction novels relied on induction coils but were not developed by Ruhmkorff.

== Asteroid ==
The asteroid 15273 Ruhmkorff, discovered in 1991 by E. W. Elst, is named after Heinrich Daniel Ruhmkorff.
