= Nicholas Callan =

Irish physicist and Catholic priest (1799–1864)

The Reverend Nicholas Callan
- Born: Nicholas Joseph Callan; 22 December 1799; Dundalk, County Louth, Kingdom of Ireland
- Died: 10 January 1864 (aged 64); Maynooth, County Kildare, Ireland
- Education: Maynooth College; Sapienza University (DD, 1826)
- Known for: Inventing the induction coil (1836)
- Title: Professor of Natural Philosophy
- Term: 1826–1864
- Scientific career
- Fields: Physics
- Workplaces: Maynooth College
- Academic advisors: Cornelius Denvir

Ecclesiastical career
- Religion: Christianity
- Church: Catholic Church
- Ordained: 1823

Nicholas Joseph Callan (22 December 1799 – 10 January 1864) was an Irish physicist and Catholic priest known for his work on the induction coil.

== Early life and education ==
He was born and raised in Dundalk, County Louth, where he attended school at an academy. His local parish priest, Father Andrew Levins, then took him in hand as an altar boy and Mass server, and saw him start the priesthood at Navan seminary. He entered Maynooth College in 1816. In his third year at Maynooth, Callan studied natural and experimental philosophy under Cornelius Denvir. He introduced the experimental method into his teaching and had an interest in electricity and magnetism.

Callan was ordained a priest in 1823 and went to Rome to study at Sapienza University, obtaining a doctorate in divinity in 1826. While in Rome he became acquainted with the work of the pioneers in electricity such as Luigi Galvani (1737–1798) who was a pioneer in bioelectricity and Alessandro Volta (1745–1827) who is known especially for the development of the electric battery. In 1826, Callan returned to Maynooth as the new professor of natural philosophy (now called physics), where he also began working with electricity in his basement laboratory at the college.

== Induction coil ==
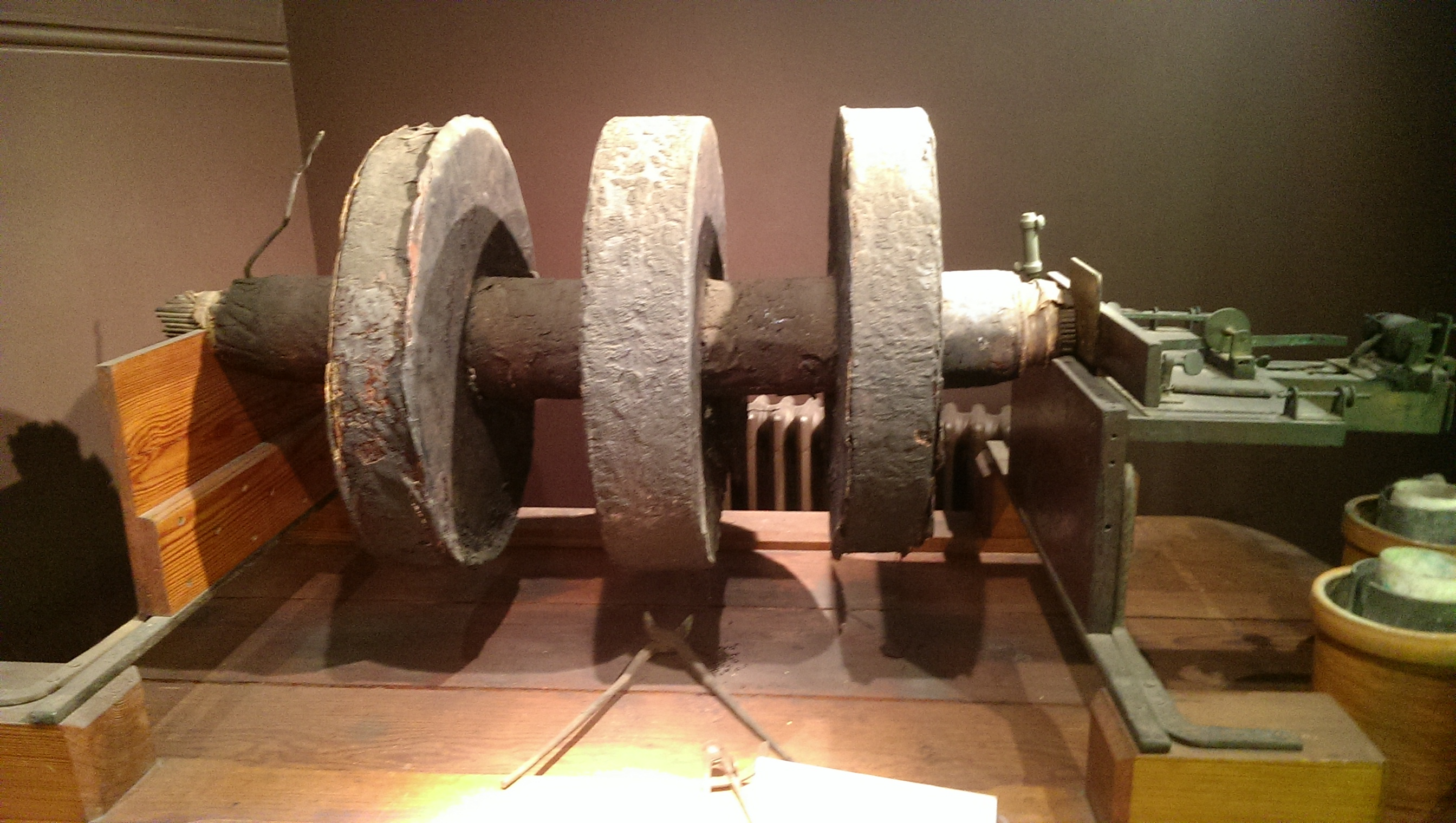
Callan's Induction Coil at the National Science Museum, Maynooth

Influenced by William Sturgeon and Michael Faraday, Callan began work on the idea of the induction coil in 1834. He invented the first induction coil in 1836. An induction coil produces an intermittent high-voltage alternating current from a low-voltage direct current supply. It has a primary coil consisting of a few turns of thick wire wound around an iron core and subjected to a low voltage (usually from a battery). Wound on top of this is a secondary coil made up of many turns of thin wire. An iron armature and make-and-break mechanism repeatedly interrupts the current to the primary coil, producing a high-voltage, rapidly alternating current in the secondary circuit.

Callan invented the induction coil because he needed to generate a higher level of electricity than currently available. He took a bar of soft iron, about 2 feet (0.61 m) long, and wrapped it around with two lengths of copper wire, each about 200 feet (61 m) long. Callan connected the beginning of the first coil to the beginning of the second. Finally, he connected a battery, much smaller than the enormous contrivance just described, to the beginning and end of the winding one. He found that when the battery contact was broken, a shock could be felt between the first terminal of the first coil and the second terminal of the second coil.

Further experimentation showed how the coil device could bring the shock from a small battery up to the strength level of a big battery. So, Callan tried making a bigger coil. With a battery of only 14 seven-inch (178 mm) plates, the device produced power enough for an electric shock "so strong that a person who took it felt the effects of it for several days". Callan thought of his creation as a kind of electromagnet; but what he actually made was a primitive induction transformer.

Callan's induction coil also used an interrupter that consisted of a rocking wire that repeatedly dipped into a small cup of mercury (similar to the interrupters used by Charles Page). Because of the action of the interrupter, which could make and break the current going into the coil, he called his device the "repeater." Actually, this device was the world's first transformer. Callan had induced a high voltage in the second wire, starting with a low voltage in the adjacent first wire. And the faster he interrupted the current, the bigger the spark. In 1837 he produced his giant induction machine: using a mechanism from a clock to interrupt the current 20 times a second, it generated 15-inch (380 mm) sparks, an estimated 600,000 volts and the largest artificial bolt of electricity then seen.

== The 'Maynooth Battery' and other inventions ==
Callan experimented with designing batteries after he found the models available to him at the time to be insufficient for research in electromagnetism. The Year-book of Facts in Science and Art, published in 1849, has an article titled "The Maynooth Battery" which begins "We noticed this new and cheap Voltaic Battery in the Year-book of Facts, 1848, p. 14,5. The inventor, the Rev. D. Callan, Professor of Natural Philosophy in Maynooth College, has communicated to the Philosophical Magazine, No. 219, some additional experiments, comparing the power of a cast-iron (or Maynooth) battery with that of a Grove's of equal size." Some previous batteries had used rare metals such as platinum or unresponsive materials like carbon and zinc. Callan found that he could use inexpensive cast-iron instead of platinum or carbon. For his Maynooth battery, he used iron casting for the outer casing and placed a zinc plate in a porous pot (a pot that had an inside and outside chamber for holding two different types of acid) in the centre. Using a single fluid cell he disposed of the porous pot and two different fluids. He was able to build a battery with just a single solution.

While experimenting with batteries, Callan also built the world's largest battery at that time. To construct this battery, he joined 577 individual batteries ("cells"), which used over 30 gallons of acid. Since instruments for measuring current or voltages had not yet been invented, Callan measured the strength of a battery by measuring how much weight his electromagnet could lift when powered by the battery. Using his giant battery, Callan's electromagnet lifted 2 tons. The Maynooth battery went into commercial production in London. Callan also discovered an early form of galvanisation to protect iron from rusting when he was experimenting on battery design, and he patented the idea.

He died in 1864 and is buried in the cemetery in St. Patrick's College, Maynooth.

== Legacy ==
The Callan Building on the north campus of NUI Maynooth, a university which was part of St Patrick's College until 1997, was named in his honour. In addition, Callan Hall in the south campus, is used for science and mathematics lectures. The Nicholas Callan Memorial Prize is an annual prize awarded to the best final-year student in Experimental Physics.

== Publications ==
- Electricity and Galvanism (introductory textbook), 1832

== See also ==
- List of Catholic clergy scientists

== Notes ==
- O'Hara, James G.Callan, Nicholas Joseph (1799–1864), Oxford Dictionary of National Biography, Oxford University Press, 2004
- Biography at corrosion-doctors.org
