= Induction coil =

Type of transformer

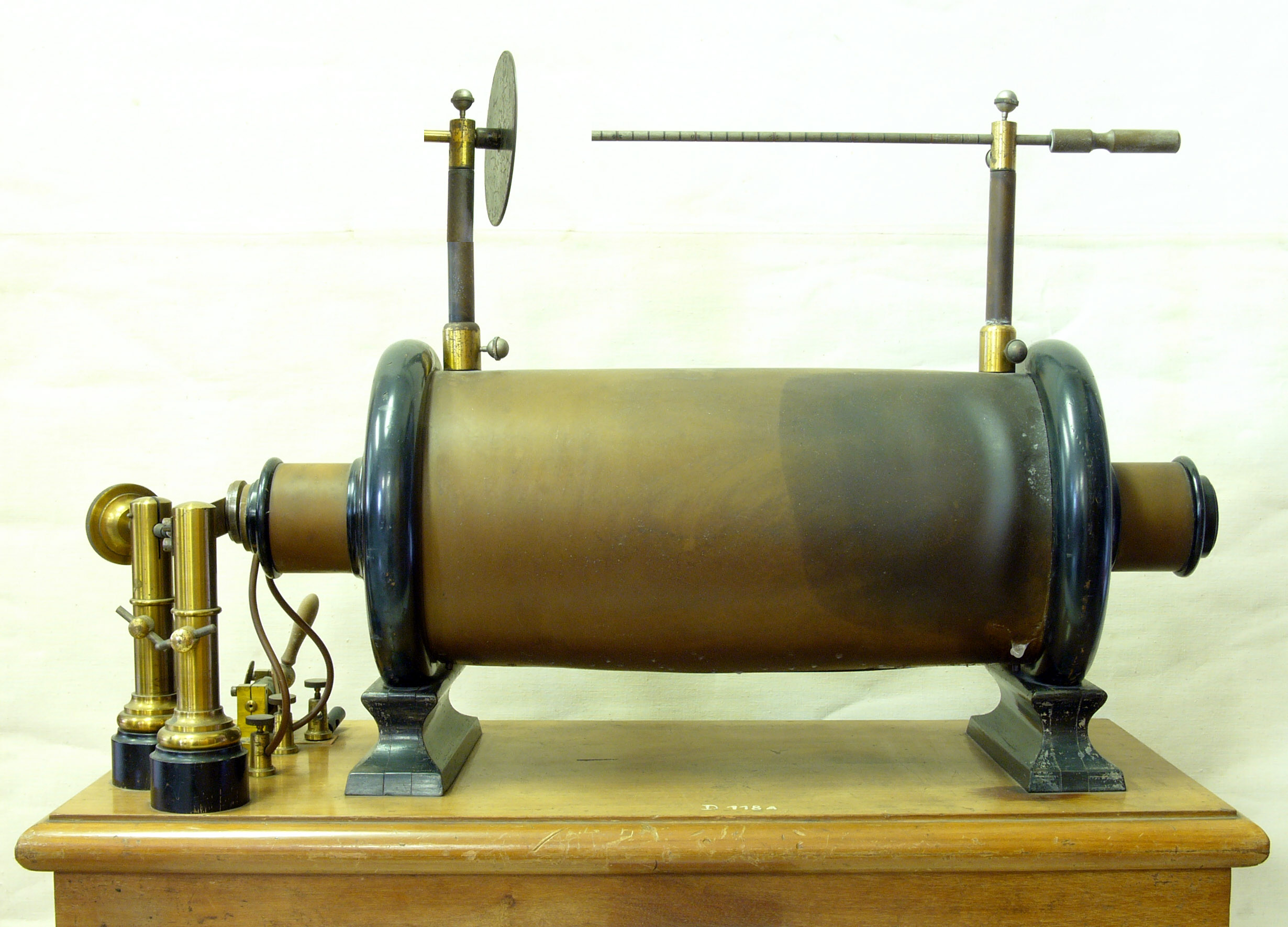
Antique induction coil used in schools from around 1900, Bremerhaven, Germany

An induction coil or "spark coil" (archaically known as an inductorium or Ruhmkorff coil after Heinrich Rühmkorff) is a type of transformer used to produce high-voltage pulses from a low-voltage direct current (DC) supply. To create the flux changes necessary to induce voltage in the secondary coil, the direct current in the primary coil is repeatedly interrupted by a vibrating mechanical contact called an interrupter. Invented in 1836 by the Irish-Catholic priest Nicholas Callan, also independently by American inventor Charles Grafton Page, the induction coil was the first type of transformer. It was widely used in x-ray machines, spark-gap radio transmitters, arc lighting and quack medical electrotherapy devices from the 1880s to the 1920s. Today its only common use is as the ignition coils in internal combustion engines and in physics education to demonstrate induction.

== Construction and function ==
Schematic diagram

An induction coil consists of two coils of insulated wire wound around a common iron core (M). One coil, called the primary winding (P), is made from relatively few (tens or hundreds) turns of coarse wire. The other coil, the secondary winding, (S) typically consists of up to a million turns of fine wire (up to 40 gauge).

An electric current is passed through the primary, creating a magnetic field. Because of the common core, most of the primary's magnetic field couples with the secondary winding. The primary behaves as an inductor, storing energy in the associated magnetic field. When the primary current is suddenly interrupted, the magnetic field rapidly collapses. This causes a high voltage pulse to be developed across the secondary terminals through electromagnetic induction. Because of the large number of turns in the secondary coil, the secondary voltage pulse is typically many thousands of volts. This voltage is often sufficient to cause an electric spark, to jump across an air gap (G) separating the secondary's output terminals. For this reason, induction coils were called spark coils.

An induction coil is traditionally characterised by the length of spark it can produce; a '4 inch' (10 cm) induction coil could produce a 4 inch spark. Until the development of the cathode ray oscilloscope, this was the most reliable measurement of peak voltage of such asymmetric waveforms. The relationship between spark length and voltage is linear within a wide range:

4 inches (10 cm) = 110kV; 8 inches (20 cm) = 150kV; 12 inches (30 cm) = 190kV; 16 inches (41 cm) = 230kV

Curves supplied by a 1984 reference agree closely with those values.

=== Interrupter ===
Without capacitor

With capacitor

Waveforms in an induction coil with output open (no spark). i_{1} (blue) is the current in the coil's primary winding, v_{2} (red) is the voltage across the secondary. Not to common scale; v_{2} is much larger in bottom drawing.

To operate the coil continually, the direct current must be repeatedly connected and disconnected to create the magnetic field changes needed for induction. To do that, induction coils use a magnetically activated vibrating arm called an interrupter or break (A) to rapidly connect and break the current flowing into the primary coil. The interrupter is mounted on the end of the coil next to the iron core. When the power is turned on, the increasing current in the primary coil produces an increasing magnetic field, the magnetic field attracts the interrupter's iron armature (A). After a time, the magnetic attraction overcomes the armature's spring force, and the armature begins to move. When the armature has moved far enough, the pair of contacts (K) in the primary circuit open and disconnect the primary current. Disconnecting the current causes the magnetic field to collapse and create the spark. Also, the collapsed field no longer attracts the armature, so the spring force accelerates the armature toward its initial position. A short time later the contacts reconnect, and the current starts building the magnetic field again. The whole process starts over and repeats many times per second. The secondary voltage v_{2} (red) is roughly proportional to the rate of change of primary current i_{1} (blue).

Opposite potentials are induced in the secondary when the interrupter breaks the circuit and closes the circuit. However, the current change in the primary is much more abrupt when the interrupter breaks. When the contacts close, the current builds up slowly in the primary because the supply voltage has a limited ability to force current through the coil's inductance. In contrast, when the interrupter contacts open, the current falls to zero suddenly. So the pulse of voltage induced in the secondary at break is much larger than the pulse induced at close, it is the break that generates the coil's high-voltage output.

=== Capacitor ===
An arc forms at the interrupter contacts on break which has undesirable effects: the arc consumes energy stored in the magnetic field, reduces the output voltage, and damages the contacts. To prevent this, a quenching capacitor (C) of 0.5 to 15 μF is connected across the primary coil to slow the rise in the voltage after a break. The capacitor and primary winding together form a tuned circuit, so on break, a damped sinusoidal wave of current flows in the primary and likewise induces a damped wave in the secondary. As a result, the high-voltage output consists of a series of damped waves.

=== Construction details ===
To prevent the high voltages generated in the coil from breaking down the thin insulation and arcing between the secondary wires, the secondary coil uses special construction so as to avoid having wires carrying large voltage differences lying next to each other. In one widely used technique, the secondary coil is wound in many thin flat pancake-shaped sections (called "pies"), connected in series.

The primary coil is first wound on the iron core and insulated from the secondary with a thick paper or rubber coating. Then each secondary subcoil is connected to the coil next to it and slid onto the iron core, insulated from adjoining coils with waxed cardboard disks. The voltage developed in each subcoil isn't large enough to jump between the wires in the subcoil. Large voltages are only developed across many subcoils in series, which are too widely separated to arc over. To give the entire coil a final insulating coating, it is immersed in melted paraffin wax or rosin; the air evacuated to ensure there are no air bubbles left inside and the paraffin allowed to solidify, so the entire coil is encased in wax.

To prevent eddy currents, which cause energy losses, the iron core is made of a bundle of parallel iron wires, individually coated with shellac to insulate them electrically. The eddy currents, which flow in loops in the core perpendicular to the magnetic axis, are blocked by the layers of insulation. The ends of the insulated primary coil often protruded several inches from either end of the secondary coil, to prevent arcs from the secondary to the primary or the core.

== Mercury and electrolytic interrupters ==
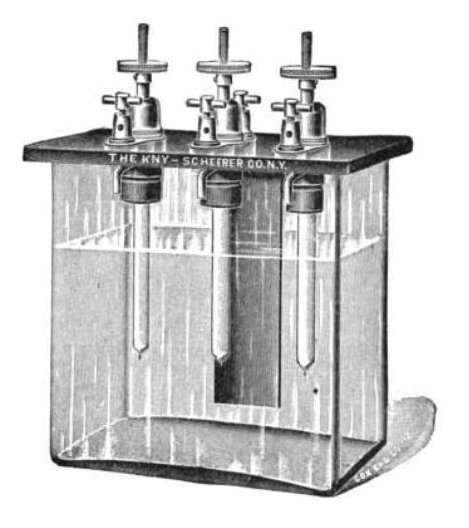
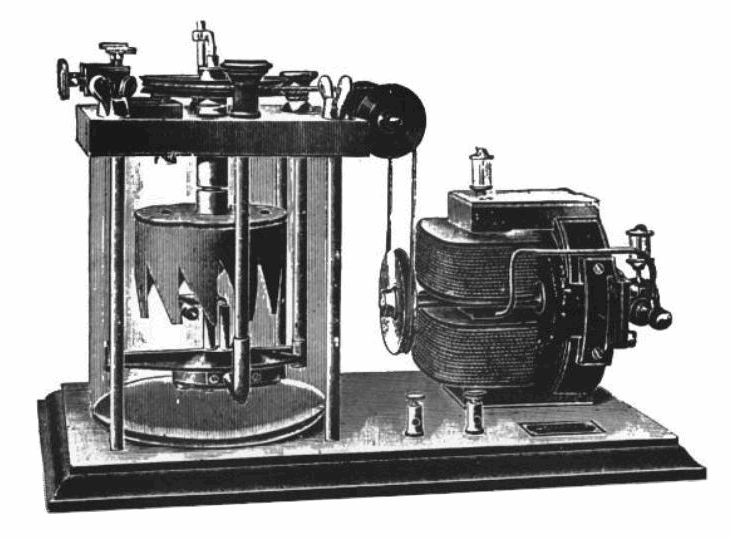
(left) 3-electrode Wehnelt interrupter used in high power coils. (right) Mercury turbine interrupter. The motor turns the toothed wheel while a stream of mercury is sprayed on the teeth. By adjusting the wheel up and down the duty cycle of the primary current can be changed.

Although modern induction coils used for educational purposes all use the vibrating arm 'hammer' type interrupter described above, these were inadequate for powering the large induction coils used in spark-gap radio transmitters and x-ray machines around the turn of the 20th century. In powerful coils the high primary current created arcs at the interrupter contacts which quickly destroyed the contacts. Also, since each "break" produces a pulse of voltage from the coil, the more breaks per second the greater the power output. Hammer interrupters were not capable of interruption rates over 200 breaks per second and the ones used on powerful coils were limited to 20 – 40 breaks per second.

Therefore much research went into improving interrupters and improved designs were used in high power coils, with the hammer interrupters only used on small coils under 8" sparks. Léon Foucault and others developed interrupters consisting of an oscillating needle dipping into and out of a container of mercury. The mercury was covered with a layer of spirits which extinguished the arc quickly, causing faster switching. These were often driven by a separate electromagnet or motor, which allowed the interruption rate and "dwell" time to be adjusted separately from the primary current.

The largest coils used either electrolytic or mercury turbine interrupters. The electrolytic or Wehnelt interrupter, invented by Arthur Wehnelt in 1899, consisted of a short platinum needle anode immersed in an electrolyte of dilute sulfuric acid, with the other side of the circuit connected to a lead plate cathode. When the primary current passed through it, hydrogen gas bubbles formed on the needle which repeatedly broke the circuit. This resulted in a primary current broken randomly at rates up to 2000 breaks per second. They were preferred for powering X-ray tubes. They produced a lot of heat and due to this the hydrogen could explode. Mercury turbine interrupters had a centrifugal pump which sprayed a stream of liquid mercury onto rotating metal contacts. They could achieve interruption rates up to 10,000 breaks per second and were the most widely used type of interrupter in commercial wireless stations.

== History ==
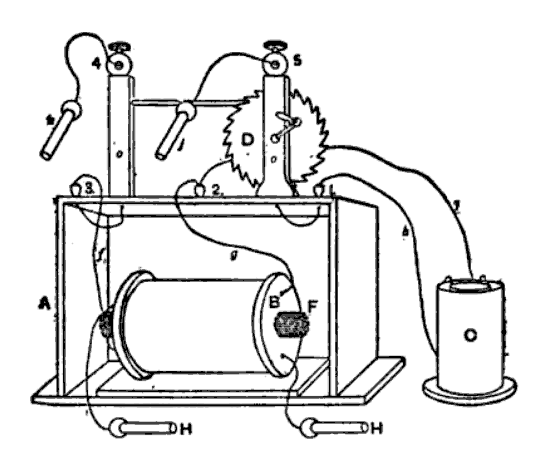
Early coil by William Sturgeon, 1837. The sawtooth zinc interrupter wheel (D) was turned by hand. The first coil to use a divided core of iron wires (F) to prevent eddy currents.

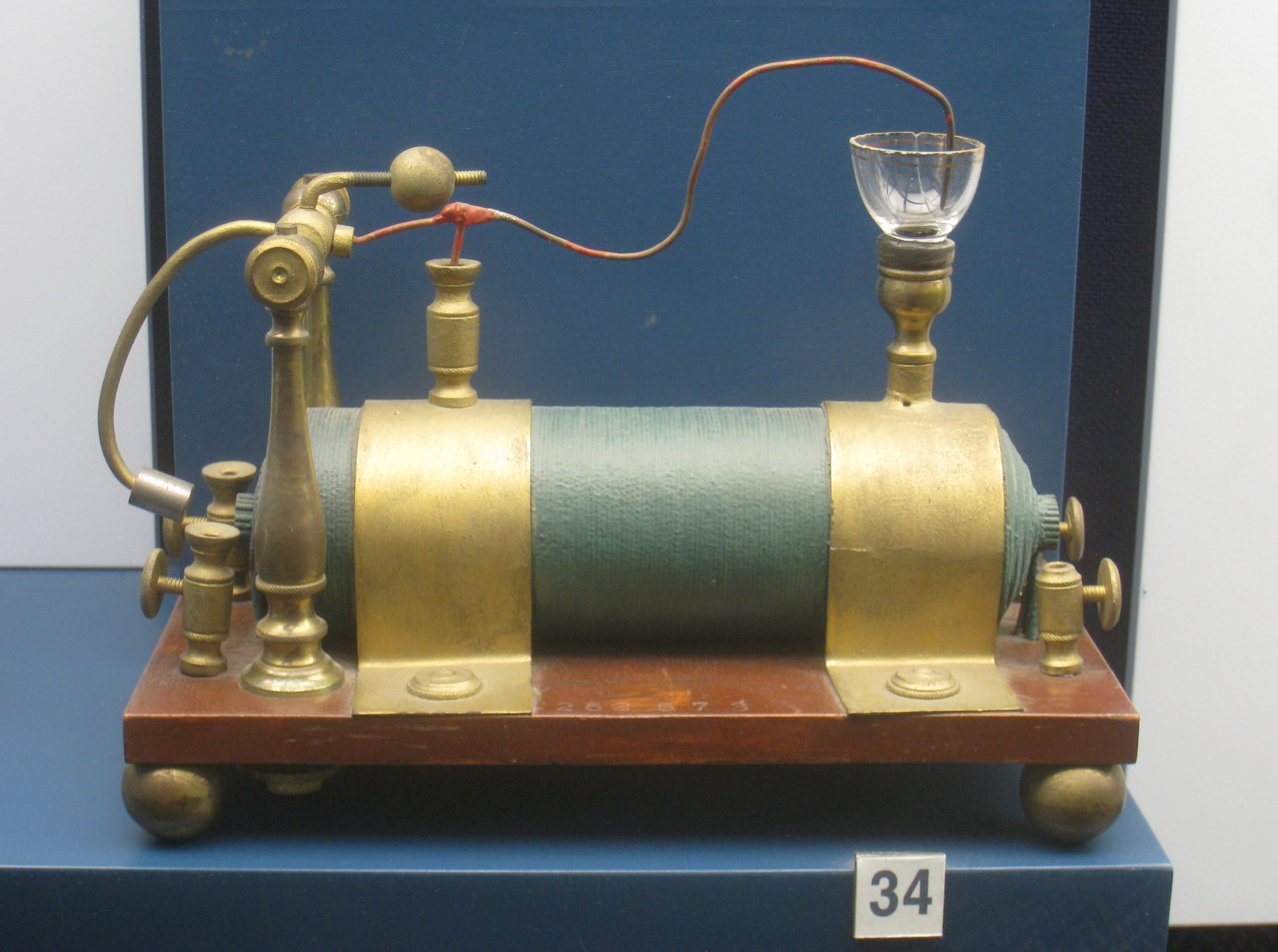
Early coil by Charles G. Page, 1838, had one of the first automatic interrupters. The cup was filled with mercury. The magnetic field attracted the iron piece on the arm (left), lifting the wire out of the cup, breaking the primary circuit.

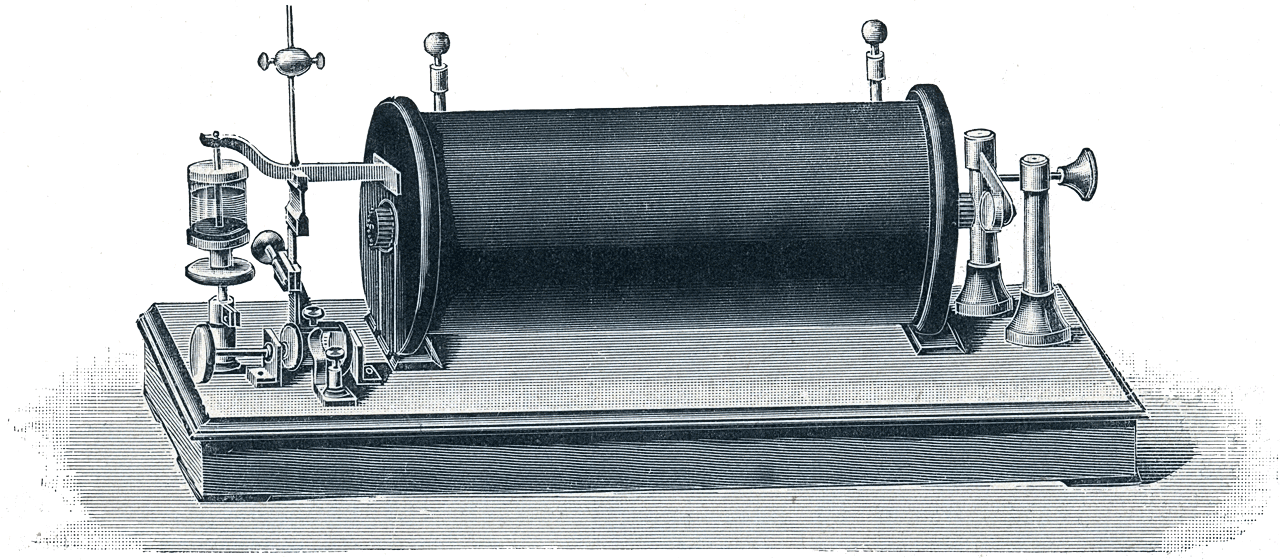
Induction coil by Heinrich Ruhmkorff, 1850s. In addition to the hammer interrupter (right), it had a mercury interrupter by Fizeau (left) that could be adjusted to change the dwell time.

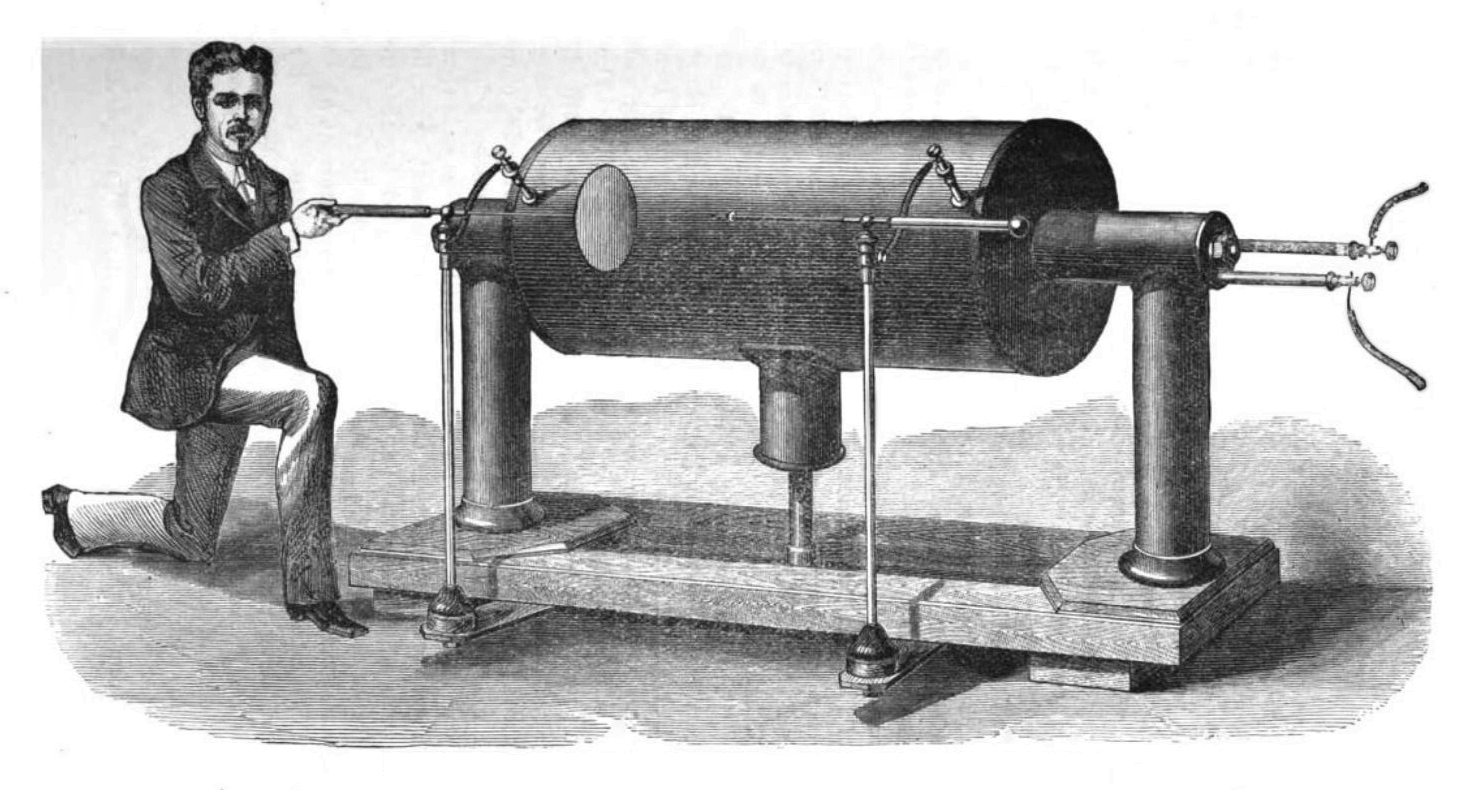
One of the largest coils ever constructed, built in 1877 by Alfred Apps for William Spottiswoode. Wound with 280 miles of wire, could produce a 42 in. (106 cm) spark, corresponding to roughly one million volts. Powered by 30 quart size liquid batteries and a separate interrupter (not shown).

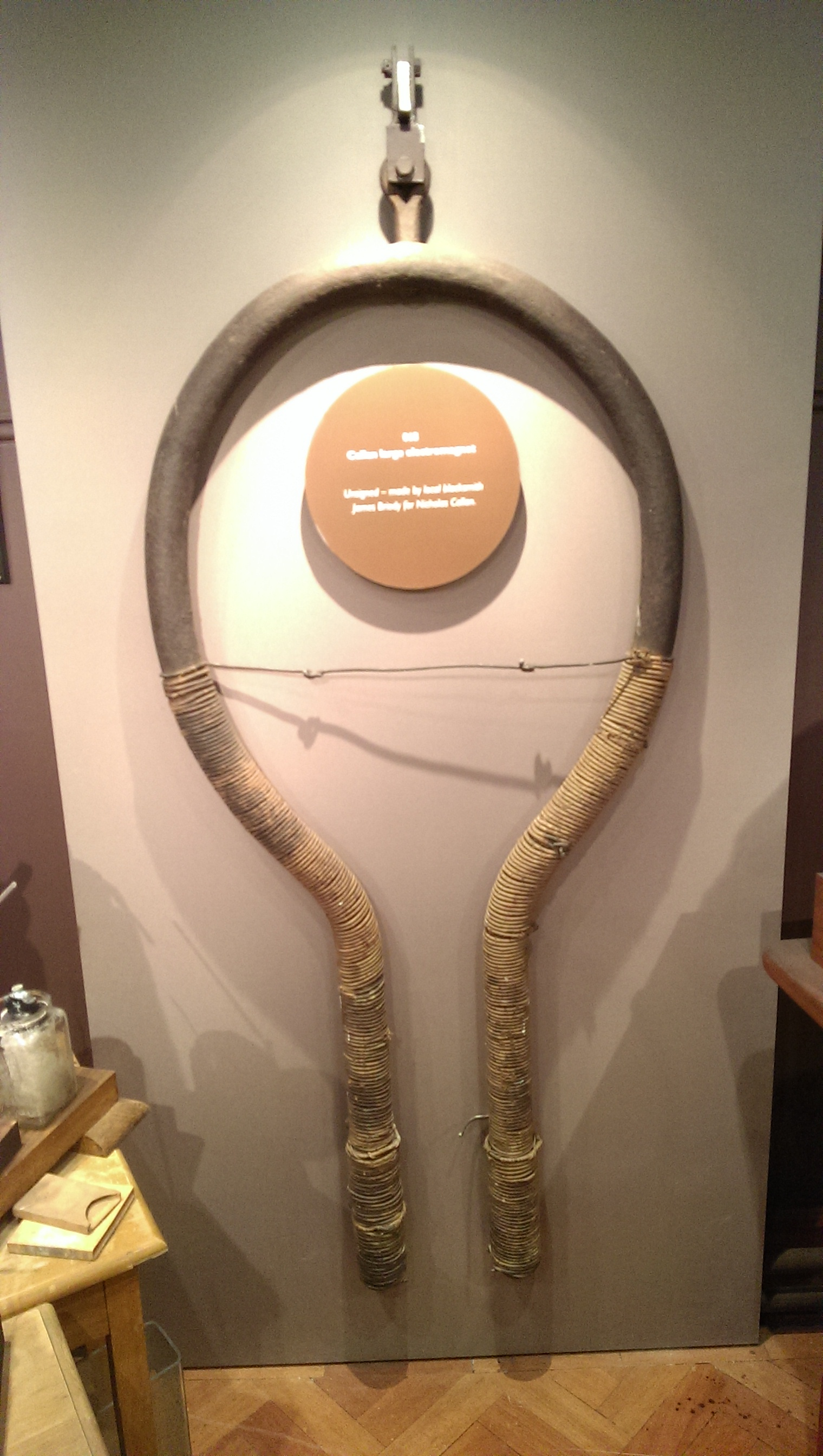
The first induction coil, built by Nicholas Callan, 1836.

The induction coil was the first type of electrical transformer. During its development between 1836 and the 1860s, mostly by trial and error, researchers discovered many of the principles that governed all transformers, such as the proportionality between turns and output voltage and the use of a "divided" iron core to reduce eddy current losses.

Michael Faraday discovered the principle of induction, Faraday's induction law, in 1831 and did the first experiments with induction between coils of wire. The induction coil was invented by the American physician Charles Grafton Page in 1836 and independently by Irish scientist and Catholic priest Nicholas Callan in the same year at the St. Patrick's College, Maynooth and improved by William Sturgeon. George Henry Bachhoffner and Sturgeon (1837) independently discovered that a "divided" iron core of iron wires reduced power losses. The early coils had hand cranked interrupters, invented by Callan and Antoine Philibert Masson (1837). The automatic 'hammer' interrupter was invented by Rev. Prof. James William MacGauley (1838) of Dublin, Ireland, Johann Philipp Wagner (1839), and Christian Ernst Neeff (1847). Hippolyte Fizeau (1853) introduced the use of the quenching capacitor. Heinrich Ruhmkorff generated higher voltages by greatly increasing the length of the secondary, in some coils using 5 or 6 miles (10 km) of wire and produced sparks up to 16 inches. In the early 1850s, American inventor Edward Samuel Ritchie introduced the divided secondary construction to improve insulation. Jonathan Nash Hearder worked on induction coils. Callan's induction coil was named an IEEE Milestone in 2006.

Induction coils were used to provide high voltage for early gas discharge and Crookes tubes and other high voltage research. They were also used to provide entertainment (lighting Geissler tubes, for example) and to drive small "shocking coils", Tesla coils and violet ray devices used in quack medicine. They were used by Hertz to demonstrate the existence of electromagnetic waves, as predicted by James Clerk Maxwell and by Lodge and Marconi in the first research into radio waves. Their largest industrial use was probably in early wireless telegraphy spark-gap radio transmitters and to power early cold cathode x-ray tubes from the 1890s to the 1920s, after which they were supplanted in both these applications by AC transformers and vacuum tubes. However their largest use was as the ignition coil or spark coil in the ignition system of internal combustion engines, where they are still used, although the interrupter contacts are now replaced by solid state switches. A smaller version is used to trigger the flash tubes used in cameras and strobe lights.

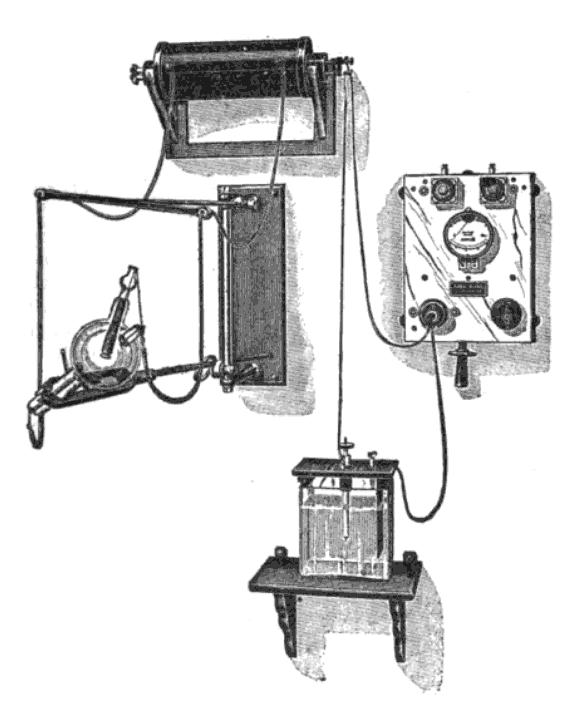
Induction coil (top) powering 1915 wall mounted x-ray unit, with electrolytic interrupter (bottom).

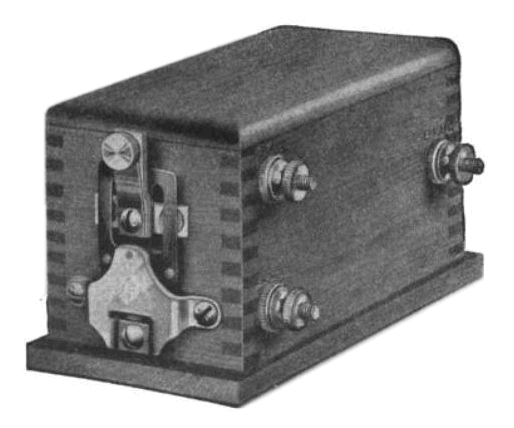
Vibrator ignition coil used in early automobiles such as the Ford Model T around 1910

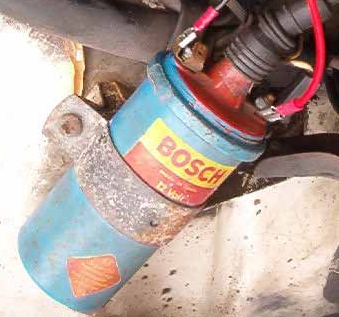
Modern automobile ignition coil, the largest remaining use for induction coils

== See also ==
- Ignition coil
- Trembler coil
- Spark gap transmitter
- Transformer
- Tesla coil
- Faraday's law of induction
- Ignition system
- Inductor
- Magnetic field
- Nicholas Callan
