= Belle Époque =

Period in European history, 1871–1914

- 1871–1914
Age of Romanticism (Second Republic and Second Empire)	World War I, Interwar France, Années folles
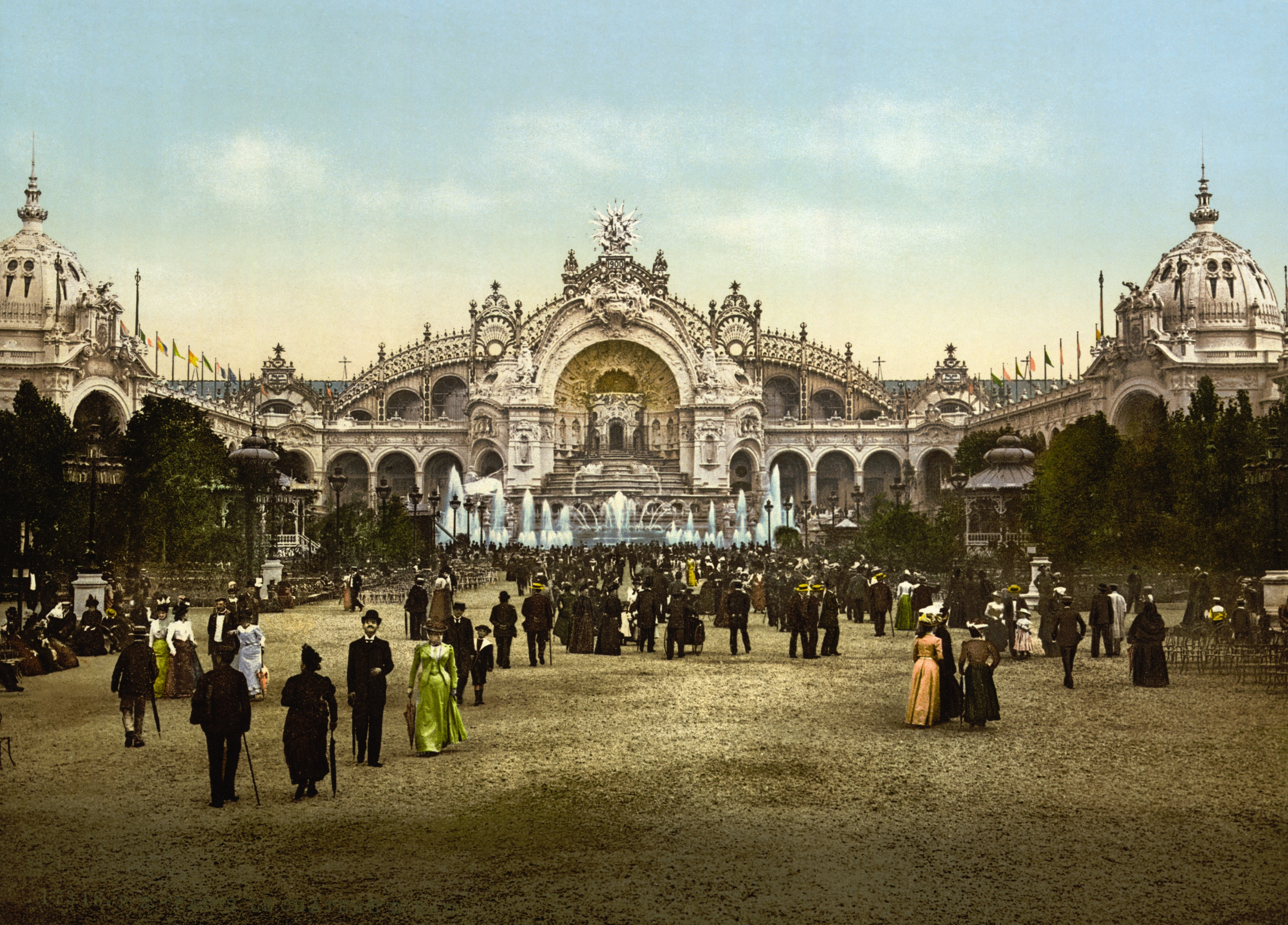
- 1900 World's Fair in Paris, France
- Including: Revanchism; Scramble for Africa; Dreyfus affair; Affair of the Cards; Start of World War I
- Leader(s): Patrice de MacMahon, Jules Grévy, Jules Ferry, Sadi Carnot, Georges Ernest Boulanger, Raymond Poincaré

The Belle Époque (French pronunciation: [bɛlepɔk]) (French for 'Beautiful Era') was a period of French and European history that began after the end of the Franco-Prussian War in 1871 and continued until the outbreak of World War I in 1914. Occurring during the era of the Third French Republic, it was a period characterized by optimism, enlightenment, regional peace, economic prosperity, nationalism, colonial expansion, and technological, scientific and cultural innovations. In this era of France's cultural and artistic climate (particularly in Paris of that time), the arts markedly flourished, and numerous masterpieces of literature, music, theatre and visual art gained extensive recognition.

The Belle Époque was so named in retrospect, when it began to be considered a continental European "Golden Age" in contrast to the violence of the Napoleonic Wars and World War I. The Belle Époque was a period in which, according to historian R. R. Palmer, "European civilisation achieved its greatest power in global politics, and also exerted its maximum influence upon peoples outside Europe."

== Popular culture and fashions ==
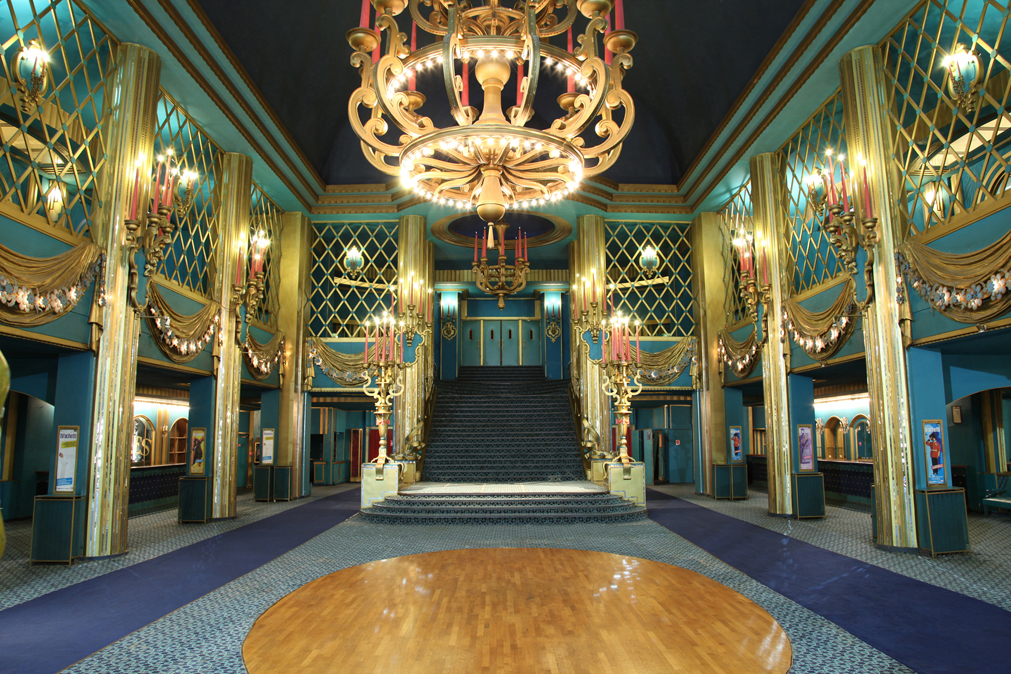
Grand foyer of the Folies Bergère cabaret

Two devastating world wars and their aftermath made the Belle Époque appear to be a time of joie de vivre (joy of living) in contrast to 20th-century hardships. It was also a period of stability that France enjoyed after the tumult of the early years of the Third Republic, featuring defeat in the Franco-Prussian War, the uprising of the Paris Commune, and the fall of General Georges Ernest Boulanger. The defeat of Boulanger, and the celebrations tied to the 1889 World's Fair in Paris, launched an era of optimism and affluence. French imperialism was in its prime. It was a cultural center of global influence; its educational, scientific and medical institutions were at the leading edge of Europe.

It was not entirely the reality of life in Paris or in France, however. France had a large economic underclass who never experienced much of the Belle Époque's wonders and entertainments. Poverty remained endemic in Paris's urban slums and rural peasantry for decades after the Belle Époque ended. Conflicts between the government and the Roman Catholic Church were regular during the period. Some of the artistic elite saw the fin de siècle in a pessimistic light.

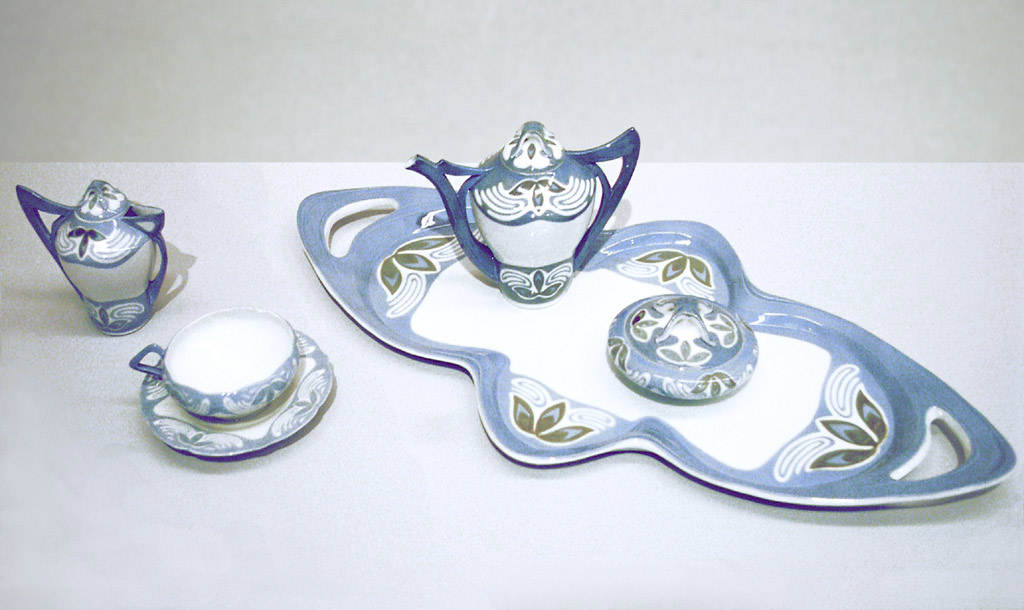
Art Nouveau style coffee service in Meissen Porcelain, by Theodor Grust, 1902

Those who were able to benefit from the prosperity of the era were drawn towards new forms of light entertainment during the Belle Époque, and the Parisian bourgeoisie, or the successful industrialists called the nouveaux riches, became increasingly influenced by the habits and fads of the city's elite social class, known popularly as Tout-Paris ("all of Paris", or "everyone in Paris"). The Casino de Paris opened in 1890. For Paris's less affluent public, entertainment was provided by cabarets, bistros and music halls.

The Moulin Rouge cabaret is a Paris landmark still open for business today. The Folies Bergère was another landmark venue. Burlesque performance styles were more mainstream in Belle Époque Paris than in more staid cities of Europe and America. Liane de Pougy, dancer, socialite and courtesan, was well known in Paris as a headline performer at top cabarets. Belle Époque dancers and singers such as Polaire, Mistinguett, Paulus, Eugénie Fougère, La Goulue and Jane Avril were Paris celebrities, some of whom modelled for Toulouse-Lautrec's iconic poster art. The Can-can dance was a popular 19th-century cabaret style that appears in Toulouse-Lautrec's posters from the era.

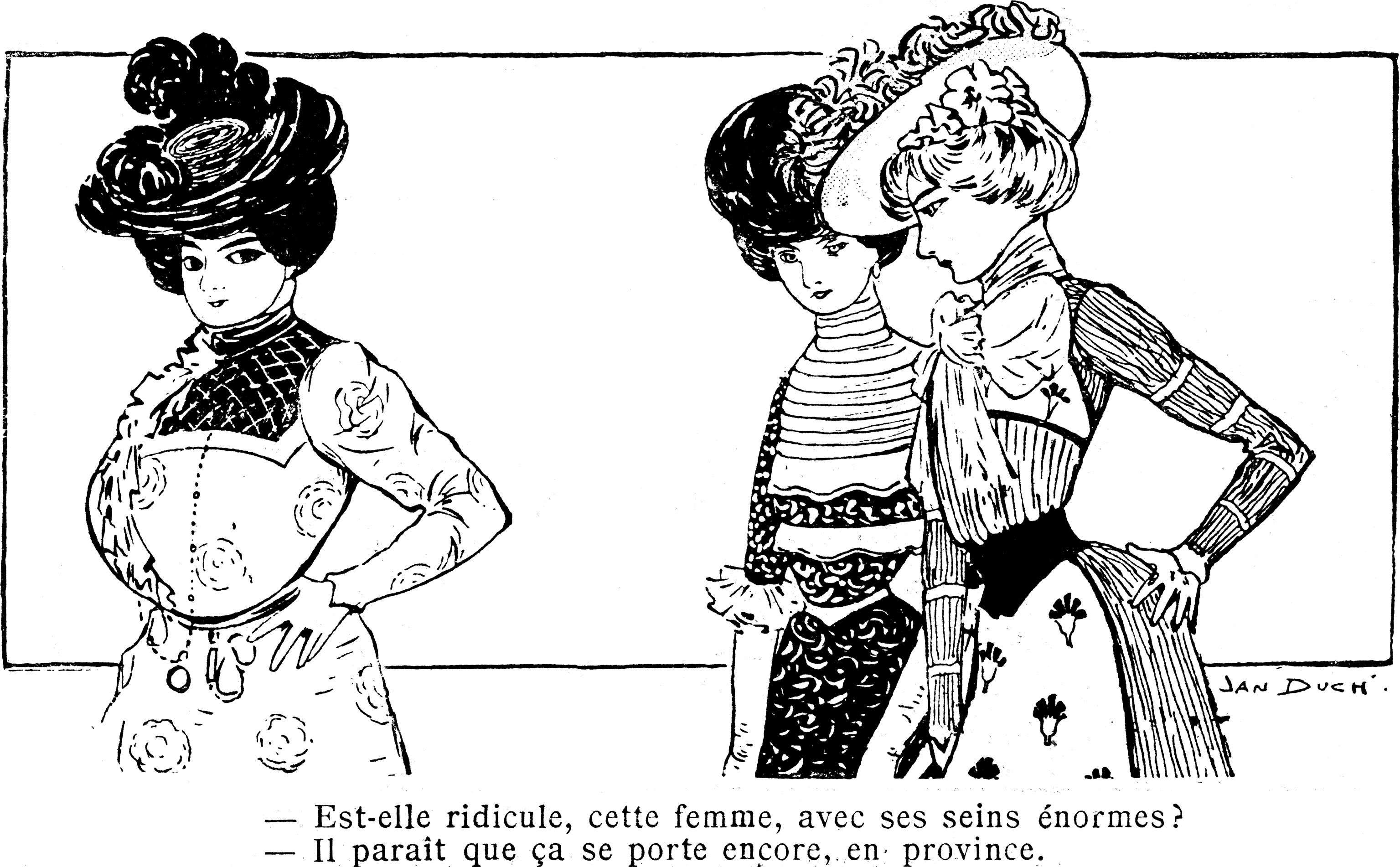
A 1900 cartoon by Jan Duch from the magazine Le Frou Frou satirising a Parisian style trend favouring small breasts ("Is she ridiculous, this woman, with her enormous bosom?" "It seems that it is still going in the provinces.")

The Eiffel Tower, built to serve as the grand entrance to the 1889 World's Fair held in Paris, became the accustomed symbol of the city, to its inhabitants and to visitors from around the world. Paris hosted another successful World's Fair in 1900, the Exposition Universelle. Paris had been profoundly changed by the Second Empire reforms to the city's architecture and public amenities. Haussmann's renovation of Paris changed its housing, street layouts, and green spaces. The walkable neighbourhoods were well-established by the Belle Époque.

Cheap coal and cheap labour contributed to the cult of the orchid and made possible the perfection of fruits grown under glass, as the apparatus of state dinners extended to the upper classes. Exotic feathers and furs were more prominently featured in fashion than ever before, as haute couture was invented in Paris, the center of the Belle Époque, where fashion began to move in a yearly cycle. In Paris, restaurants such as Maxim's Paris achieved a new splendor and cachet as places for the rich to parade. Maxim's Paris was arguably the city's most exclusive restaurant. Bohemian lifestyles gained a different glamour, pursued in the cabarets of Montmartre.

Large public buildings such as the Opéra Garnier devoted enormous spaces to interior designs as Art Nouveau show places. After the mid-19th century, railways linked all the major cities of Europe to spa towns like Biarritz, Deauville, Vichy, Arcachon and the French Riviera. Their carriages were rigorously divided into first-class and second-class, but the super-rich now began to commission private railway coaches, as exclusivity as well as display was a hallmark of opulent luxury.

== Politics ==
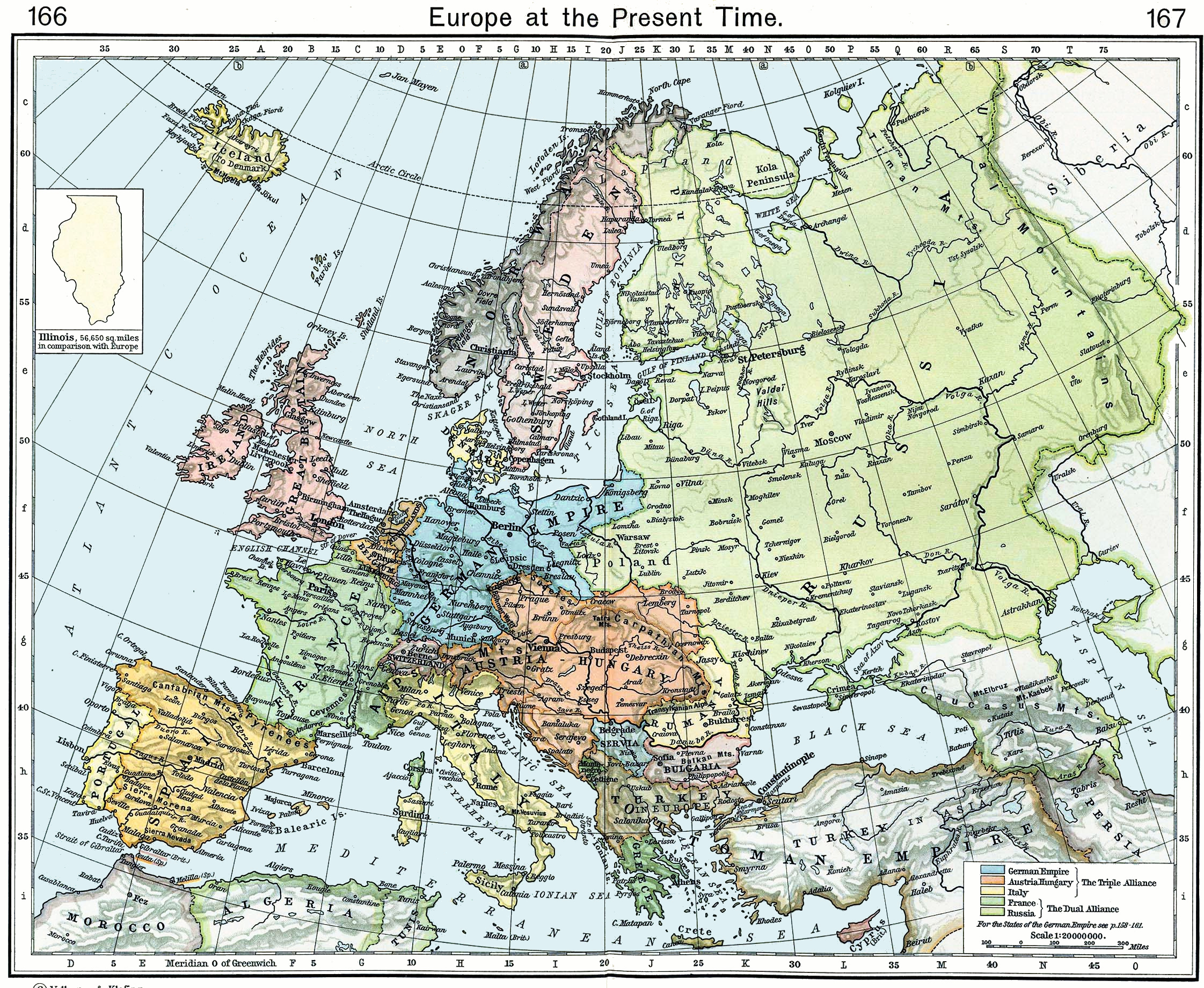
Europe during the Belle Époque (1911)

The years between the Franco-Prussian War and World War I were characterised by unusual political stability in Western and Central Europe. Although tensions between France and Germany persisted as a result of the French loss of Alsace-Lorraine to Germany in 1871, a series of diplomatic conferences managed to mediate disputes that threatened the general peace: the Congress of Berlin in 1878, the Berlin Conference in 1884, and the Algeciras Conference in 1906. Indeed, for many Europeans during the Belle Époque, transnational, class-based affiliations were as important as national identities, particularly among aristocrats. An upper-class gentleman could travel through much of Western Europe without a passport and even reside abroad with minimal bureaucratic regulation. World War I, mass transportation, the spread of literacy, and various citizenship concerns changed this.

The Belle Époque featured a class structure that ensured cheap labour. The Paris Métro underground railway system joined the omnibus and streetcar in transporting the working population, including those servants who did not live in the wealthy centers of cities. One result of this commuting was suburbanisation allowing working-class and upper-class neighbourhoods to be separated by large distances.

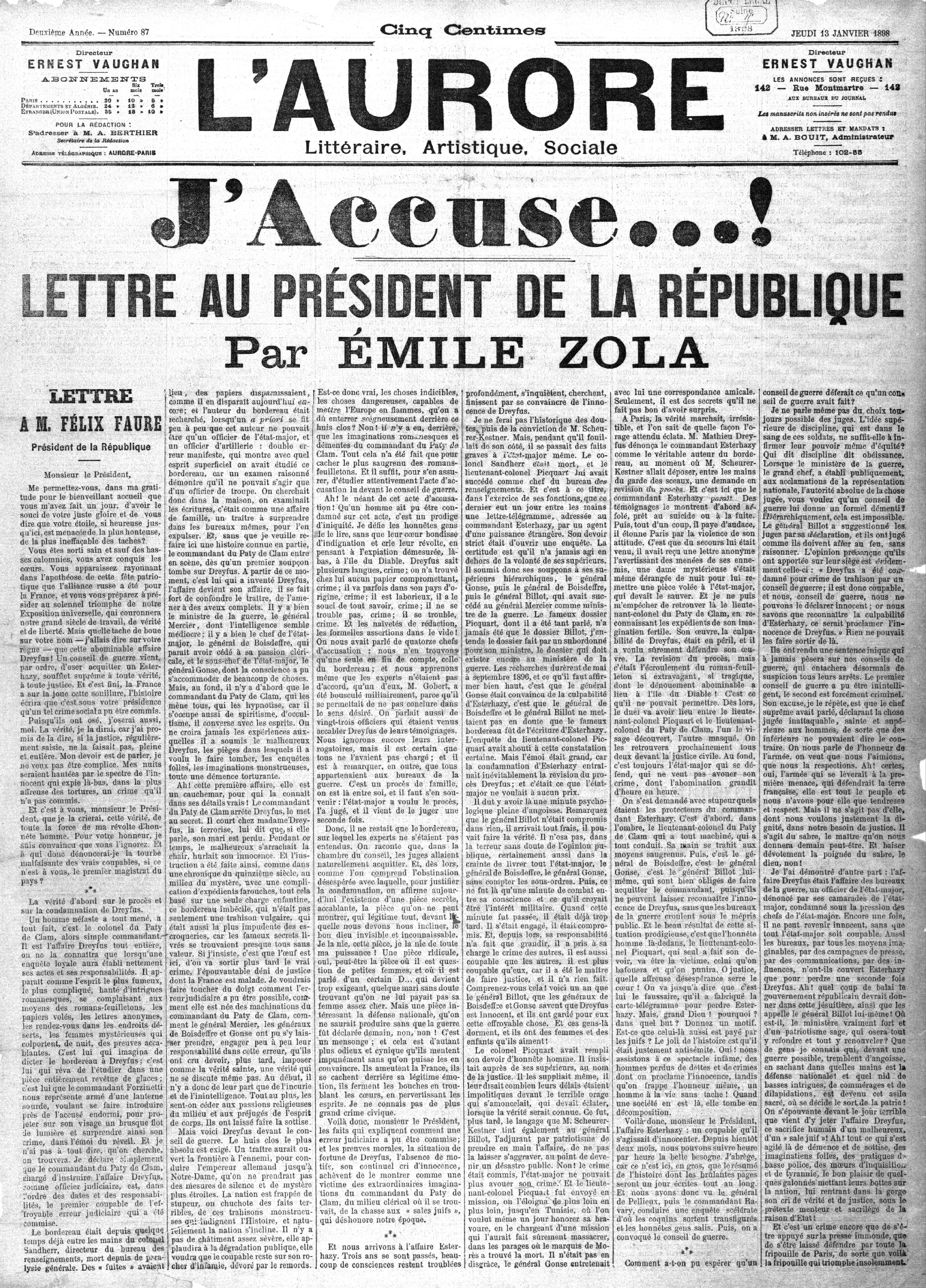
A newspaper headline for Émile Zola's open letter to the French government and the country, condemning the treatment of Captain Alfred Dreyfus during the Dreyfus affair

Meanwhile, the international workers' movement also reorganised itself and reinforced pan-European, class-based identities among the classes whose labour supported the Belle Époque. The most notable transnational socialist organisation was the Second International. Anarchists of different affiliations were active during the period leading up to World War I. Political assassinations and assassination attempts were still rare in France (unlike in Russia) but there were some notable exceptions, including the killing of President Marie François Sadi Carnot in 1894. A bomb was detonated in the Chamber of Deputies of France in 1893, causing injuries but no deaths. Terrorism against civilians also occurred in 1894, perpetrated by Émile Henry, who killed a cafe patron and wounded several others.

France enjoyed relative political stability at home during the Belle Époque. The sudden death of President Félix Faure while in office took the country by surprise, but had no destabilising effect on the government. The most serious political issue to face the country during this period was the Dreyfus affair. Captain Alfred Dreyfus was wrongly convicted of treason, with fabricated evidence from French government officials. Antisemitism directed at Dreyfus, and tolerated by the general French public in everyday society, was a central issue in the controversy and the court trials that followed. Public debate surrounding the Dreyfus Affair grew to an uproar after the publication of J'Accuse…!, an open letter sent to newspapers by prominent novelist Émile Zola, condemning government corruption and French antisemitism. The Dreyfus affair consumed the interest of the French for several years and it received heavy newspaper coverage.

Europe saw very few regime changes, the major exception being Portugal, which experienced a republican revolution in 1910. However, tensions between working-class socialist parties, bourgeois liberal parties and landed or aristocratic conservative parties did increase in many countries, and it has been claimed that profound political instability belied the calm surface of European politics in the era. In fact, militarism and international tensions grew considerably between 1897 and 1914, and the immediate prewar years were marked by a general armaments competition in Europe. Additionally, this era was one of massive overseas colonialism, known as the New Imperialism. The most famous portion of this imperial expansion was the Scramble for Africa.

=== Conflicts and wars ===
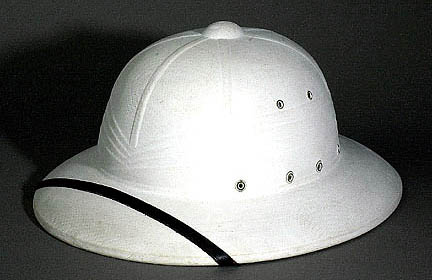
The pith helmet is an icon of colonialism in the tropical areas of the planet.

Major world empires on the eve of World War I.

Most of the great powers (and some minor ones such as Belgium, the Netherlands, or Denmark) became involved in imperialism, building their own overseas empires, especially in Africa and Asia. Although there were numerous revolutions, civil wars and colonial insurrections, the most notable are: the Franco-Prussian War (1870–1871), the Russo-Turkish War (1877–1878), the War of the Pacific (1879–1884), two Boer Wars (1880–1881 and 1899–1902), the First Sino-Japanese War (1894–1895), the First Italo-Ethiopian War (1895–1896), the Greco-Turkish War (1897), the Spanish-American War (1898), the Philippine-American War (1899–1902), the Russo-Japanese War (1905), and the Italo-Turkish War (1911–1912).

The First (1912–1913) and Second Balkan Wars (1913) can be considered prologues to the First World War (1914–1918), whose level of material and human destruction at the industrial level marked the end of the Belle Époque.

There were also notable diplomatic conflicts such as the 1890 British Ultimatum, the Fashoda Incident (1898), the First Moroccan Crisis (1905–1906) and the Agadir Crisis (1911).

== Science and technology ==
The Belle Époque was an era of great scientific and technological advancement in Europe and the world in general. Inventions of the Second Industrial Revolution that became generally common in this era include the perfection of lightly sprung, noiseless carriages in a multitude of new fashionable forms, which were superseded towards the end of the era by the automobile, which was for its first decade a luxurious experiment for the well-heeled. French automobile manufacturers such as Peugeot were already pioneers in carriage manufacturing. Edouard Michelin invented removable pneumatic tires for bicycles and automobiles in the 1890s. The scooter and moped are also Belle Époque inventions.

A number of French inventors patented products with a lasting impact on modern society. After the telephone joined the telegraph as a vehicle for rapid communication, French inventor Édouard Belin developed the Belinograph, or Wirephoto, to transmit photos by telephone. The electric light began to supersede gas lighting, and neon lights were invented in France.

France was a leader of early cinema technology. The cinématographe was invented in France by Léon Bouly and put to use by Auguste and Louis Lumière, brothers who held the first film screenings in the world. The Lumière brothers made many other innovations in cinematography. It was during this era that the motion pictures were developed, though these did not become common until after World War I.

Although the aeroplane remained a fascinating experiment, France was a leader in aviation. France established the world's first national air force in 1910. Two French inventors, Louis Breguet and Paul Cornu, made independent experiments with the first flying helicopters in 1907.

Henri Becquerel discovered radioactivity in 1896 while working with phosphorescent materials. His work confirmed and explained earlier observations regarding uranium salts by Abel Niépce de Saint-Victor in 1857.

It was during this era that biologists and physicians finally came to understand the germ theory of disease, and the field of bacteriology was established. Louis Pasteur was perhaps the most famous scientist in France during this time. Pasteur developed pasteurisation and a rabies vaccine. Mathematician and physicist Henri Poincaré made important contributions to pure and applied mathematics, and also published books for the general public on mathematical and scientific subjects. Marie Skłodowska-Curie worked in France, winning the Nobel Prize for Physics in 1903, and the Nobel Prize for Chemistry in 1911. Physicist Gabriel Lippmann invented integral imaging, still in use today.

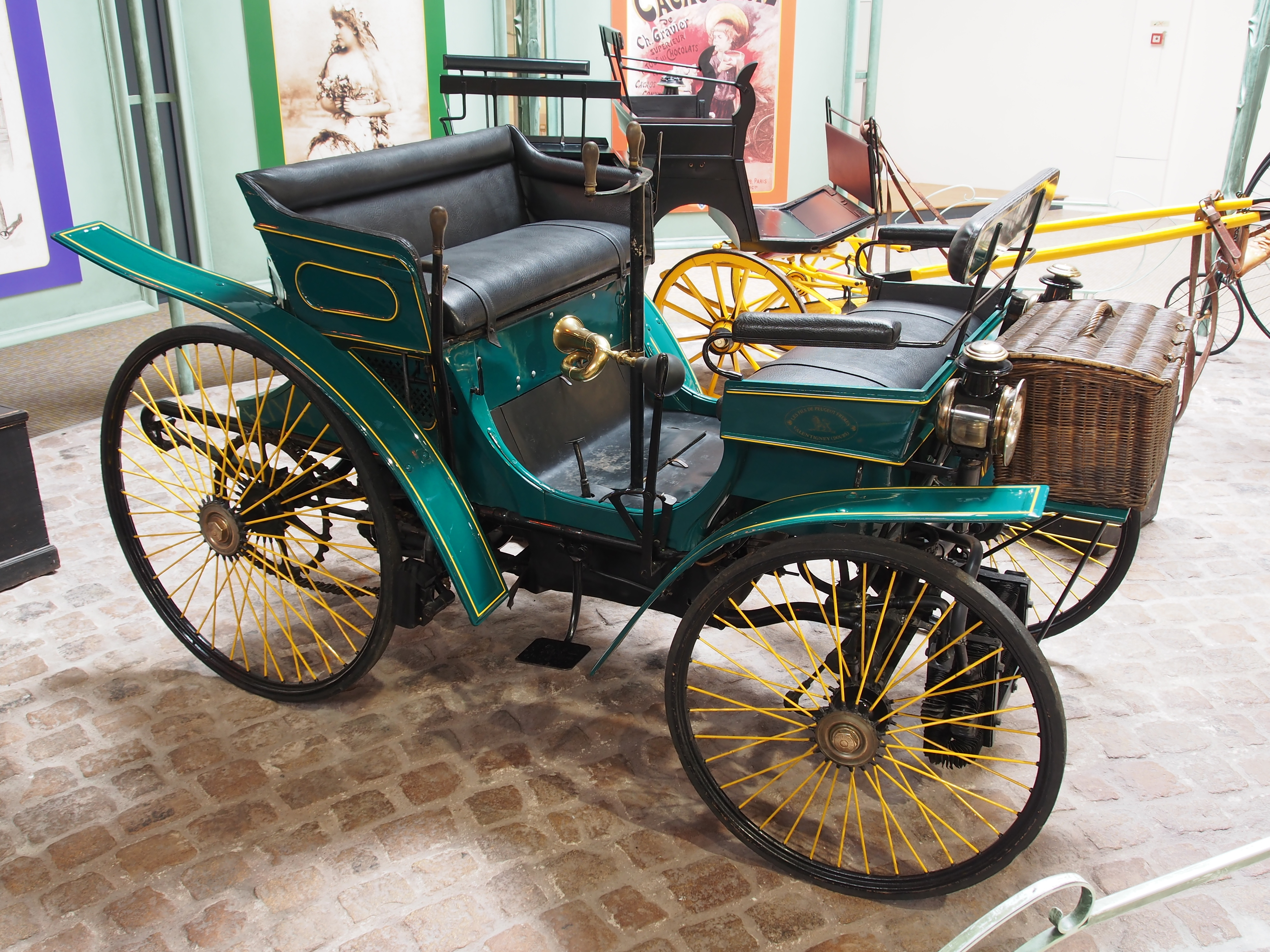
Peugeot Type 3 built in France in 1891

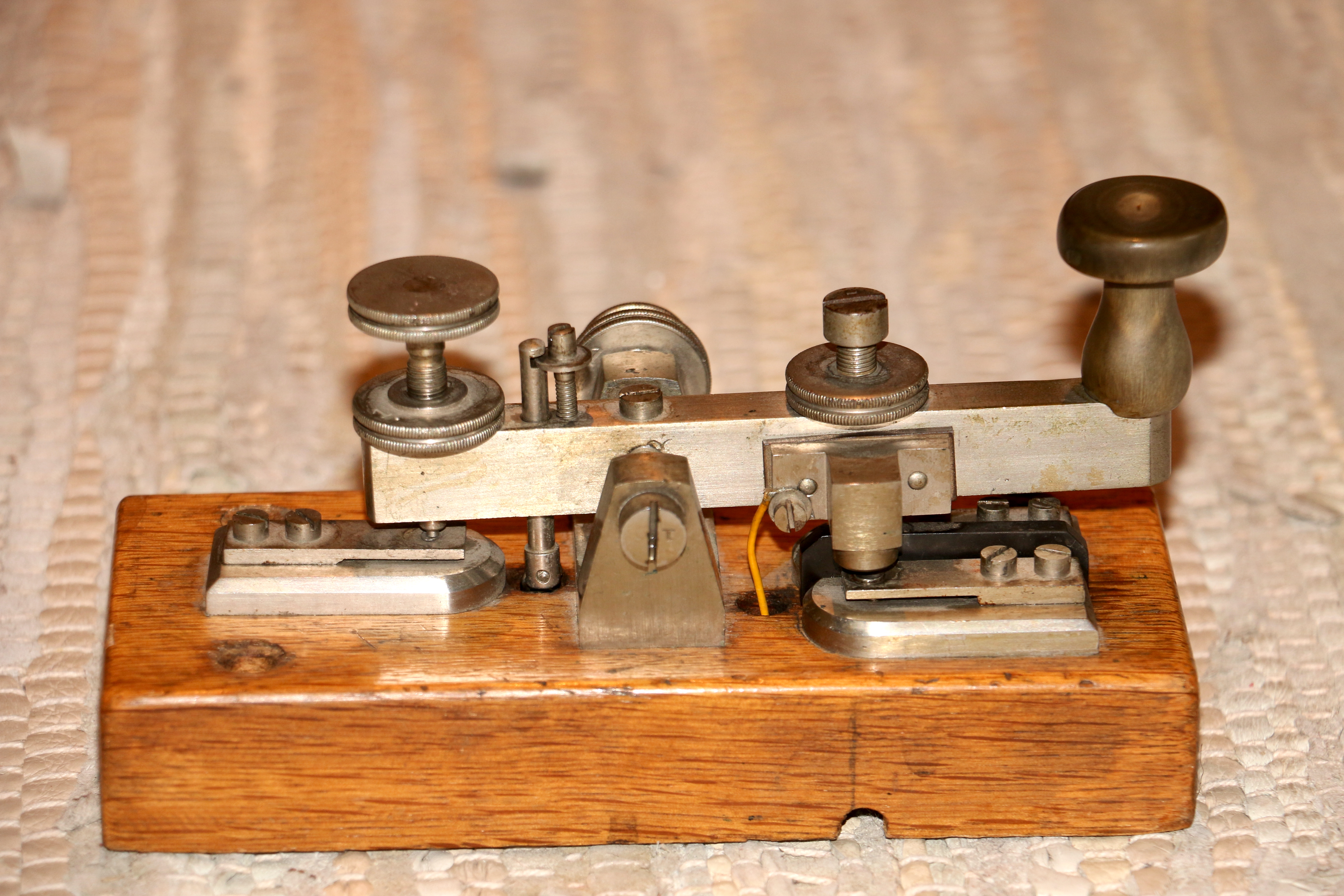
A telegraph key used to transmit messages in Morse code

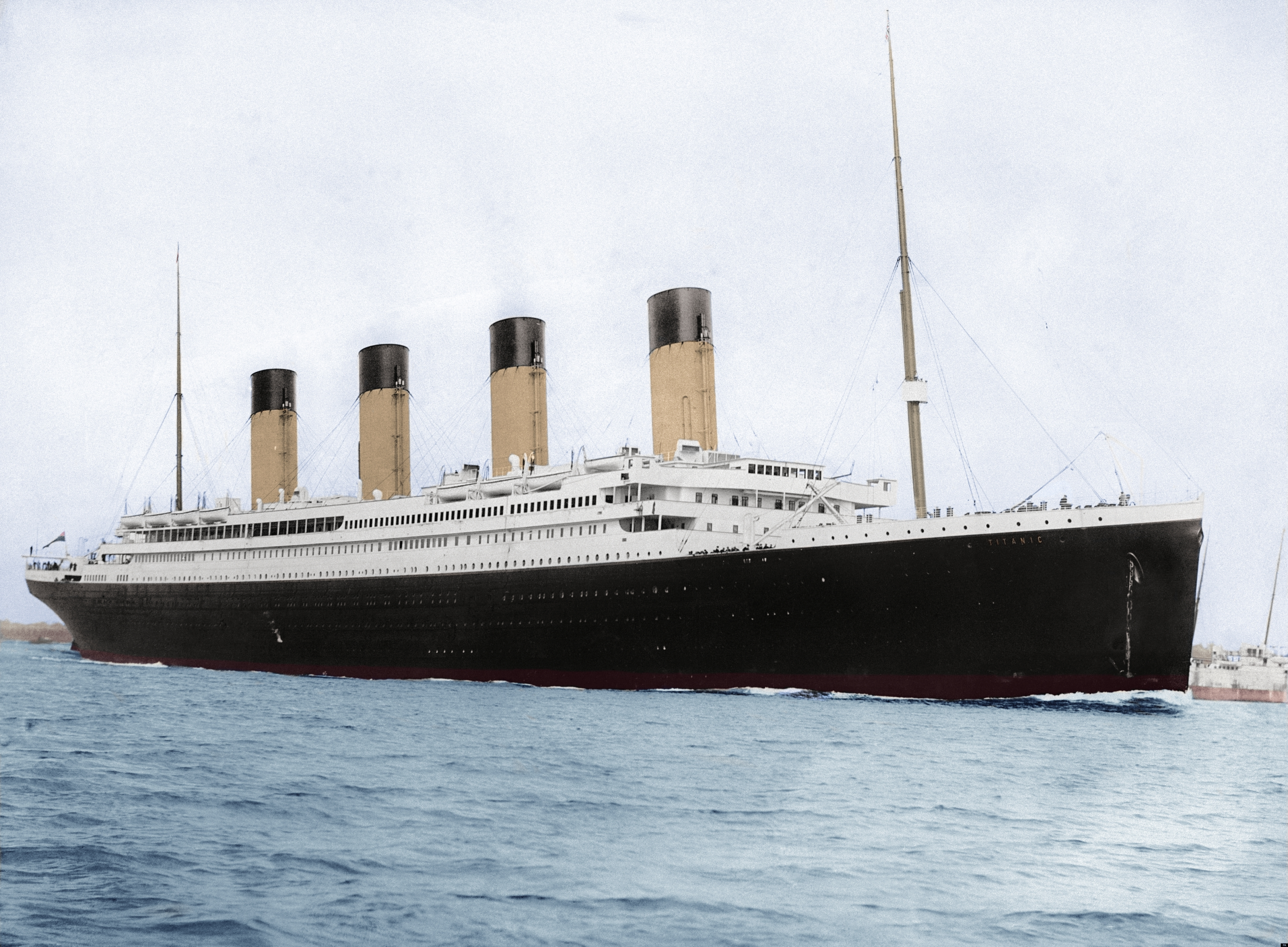
The sinking of the RMS Titanic in 1912 is the best-known tragedy of the era.

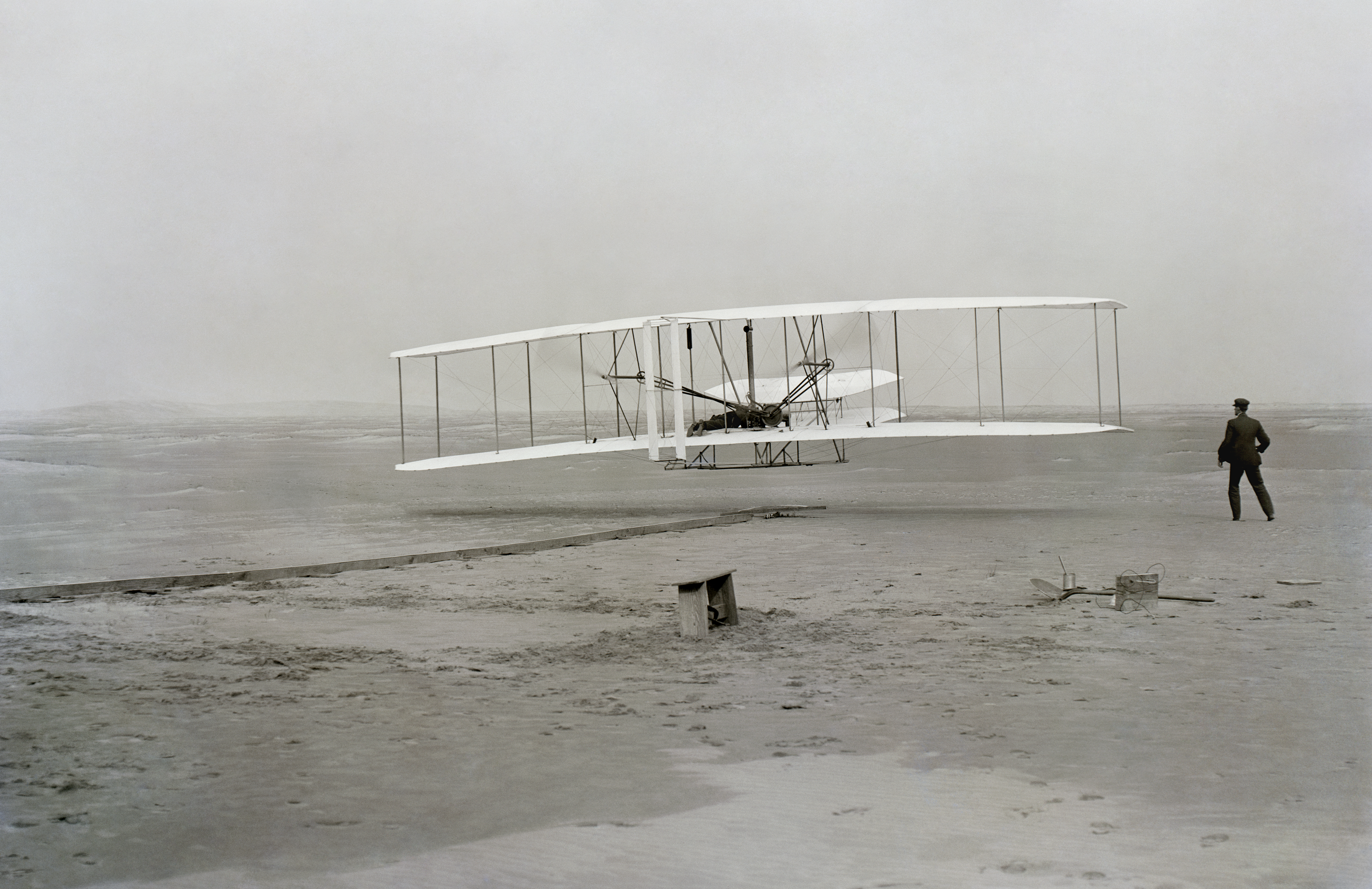
The Wright Flyer: the first sustained flight with a powered, controlled, heavier than air aircraft (1903).

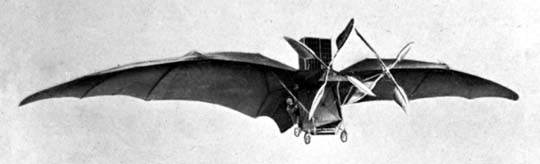
The Avion III: a steam-powered aircraft built by Clément Ader in the 1890s.

The world's first movie poster, for the comedy L'Arroseur Arrosé, 1895

== Art and literature ==
Auguste Renoir, Bal du moulin de la Galette, 1876, oil on canvas, 131 × 175 cm, Musée d'Orsay

In 1890, Vincent van Gogh died. It was during the 1890s that his paintings achieved the admiration which was denied them during his life; first among other artists, then gradually among the public. Reactions against the ideals of the Impressionists characterised visual arts in Paris during the Belle Époque. Among the post-Impressionist movements in Paris were the Nabis, the Salon de la Rose + Croix, the Symbolist movement (also in poetry, music, and visual art), Fauvism, and early Modernism. Between 1900 and 1914, Expressionism took hold of many artists in Paris and Vienna. Early works of Cubism and Abstraction were exhibited. Foreign influences were being strongly felt in Paris as well. The official art school in Paris, the École des Beaux-Arts, held an exhibition of Japanese printmaking that changed approaches to graphic design, particular posters and book illustration (Aubrey Beardsley was influenced by a similar exhibit when he visited Paris during the 1890s). Exhibits of African tribal art also captured the imagination of Parisian artists at the turn of the 20th century.

Art Nouveau is the most popularly recognised art movement to emerge from the period. This largely decorative style (Jugendstil in central Europe), characterised by its curvilinear forms, and nature-inspired motifs became prominent from the mid-1890s and dominated progressive design throughout much of Europe. Its use in public art in Paris, such as Hector Guimard's Paris Métro stations, has made it synonymous with the city.

Prominent artists in Paris during the Belle Époque included post-Impressionists such as Odilon Redon, Gustave Moreau, Maurice Denis, Pierre Bonnard, Édouard Vuillard, Paul Gauguin, Henri Matisse, Émile Bernard, Henri Rousseau, Henri de Toulouse-Lautrec (whose reputation improved substantially after his death), Giuseppe Amisani, and a young Pablo Picasso. More modern forms in sculpture also began to dominate as in the works of Paris-native Auguste Rodin.

Picasso, Les Demoiselles d'Avignon (1907), Museum of Modern Art, New York

Although Impressionism in painting began well before the Belle Époque, it had initially been met with scepticism if not outright scorn by a public accustomed to the realist and representational art approved by the Academy. In 1890, Monet started his series Haystacks. Impressionism, which had been considered the artistic avant-garde in the 1860s, did not gain widespread acceptance until after World War I. The academic painting style, associated with the Academy of Art in Paris, remained the most respected style among the public in Paris. Artists who appealed to the Belle Époque public include William-Adolphe Bouguereau, the English Pre-Raphaelite's John William Waterhouse, and Lord Leighton and his depictions of idyllic Roman scenes. More progressive tastes patronised the Barbizon school plein-air painters. These painters were associates of the Pre-Raphaelites, who inspired a generation of aesthetic-minded "Souls".

Many successful examples of Art Nouveau, with notable regional variations, were built in France, Germany, Belgium, Spain, Austria (the Vienna Secession), Hungary, Bohemia, Serbia, and Latvia. It soon spread around the world, including Peru, Brazil, Argentina, Mexico, and the United States.

European literature underwent a major transformation during the Belle Époque. Literary realism and naturalism achieved new heights. Among the most famous French realist or naturalist authors are Guy de Maupassant and Émile Zola. Realism gradually developed into modernism, which emerged in the 1890s and came to dominate European literature during the Belle Époque's final years and throughout the interwar years. The Modernist classic In Search of Lost Time was begun by Marcel Proust in 1909, to be published after World War I. The works of German Thomas Mann had a huge impact in France as well, such as Death in Venice, published in 1912. Colette shocked France with the publication of the sexually frank Claudine novel series, and other works. Joris-Karl Huysmans, who came to prominence in the mid-1880s, continued experimenting with themes and styles that would be associated with Symbolism and the Decadent movement, mostly in his book à rebours. André Gide, Anatole France, Alain-Fournier, and Paul Bourget are among France's most popular fiction writers of the era.

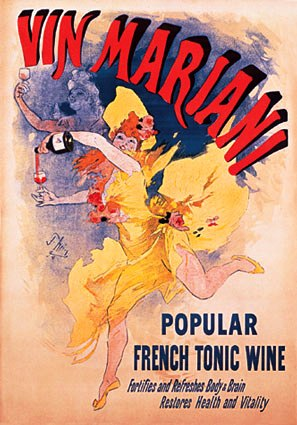
A French poster from 1894 by Jules Chéret that captures the vibrant spirit of the Belle Époque

Among poets, the Symbolists such as Charles Baudelaire remained at the forefront. Although Baudelaire's poetry collection Les Fleurs du mal had been published in the 1850s, it exerted a strong influence on the next generation of poets and artists. The Decadent movement fascinated Parisians, intrigued by Paul Verlaine and above all Arthur Rimbaud, who became the archetypal enfant terrible of France. Rimbaud's Illuminations was published in 1886, and subsequently his other works were also published, influencing Surrealists and Modernists during the Belle Époque and after. Rimbaud's poems were the first works of free verse seen by the French public. Free verse and typographic experimentation also emerged in Un coup de dés jamais n'abolira le hasard by Stéphane Mallarmé, anticipating Dada and concrete poetry. Guillaume Apollinaire's poetry introduced themes and imagery from modern life to readers. Cosmopolis: An International Monthly Review had a far-reaching impact on European writers, and ran editions in London, Paris, Saint Petersburg, and Berlin.

Paris's popular bourgeois theatre was dominated by the light farces of Georges Feydeau and cabaret performances. Theatre adopted new modern methods, including Expressionism, and many playwrights wrote plays that shocked contemporary audiences either with their frank depictions of everyday life and sexuality or with unusual artistic elements. Cabaret theatre also became popular.

Musically, the Belle Époque was characterised by salon music. This was not considered serious music but, rather, short pieces considered accessible to a general audience. In addition to works for piano solo or violin and piano, the Belle Époque was famous for its large repertory of songs (mélodies, romanze, etc.). The Italians were the greatest proponents of this type of song, its greatest champion being Francesco Paolo Tosti. Though Tosti's songs never completely left the repertoire, salon music generally fell into a period of obscurity. Even as encores, singers were afraid to sing them at serious recitals. In that period, waltzes also flourished. Operettas were also at the peak of their popularity, with composers such as Johann Strauss III, Emmerich Kálmán, and Franz Lehár. Many Belle Époque composers working in Paris are still popular today: Igor Stravinsky, Erik Satie, Claude Debussy, Lili Boulanger, Jules Massenet, César Franck, Camille Saint-Saëns, Gabriel Fauré and his pupil, Maurice Ravel. According to Fauré and Ravel, the favoured composer of the Belle Époque was Edvard Grieg, who enjoyed the height of his popularity in both Parisian concert and salon life (despite his stance on the accused in the Dreyfus affair). Ravel and Frederick Delius agreed that French music of this time was simply "Edvard Grieg plus the third act of Tristan".

Modern dance began to emerge as a powerful artistic development in theatre. Dancer Loie Fuller appeared at popular venues such as the Folies Bergère, and took her eclectic performance style abroad as well. Sergei Diaghilev's Ballets Russes brought fame to Vaslav Nijinsky and established modern ballet technique. The Ballets Russes launched several ballet masterpieces, including The Firebird and The Rite of Spring (sometimes causing audience riots at the same time).

== Gallery ==
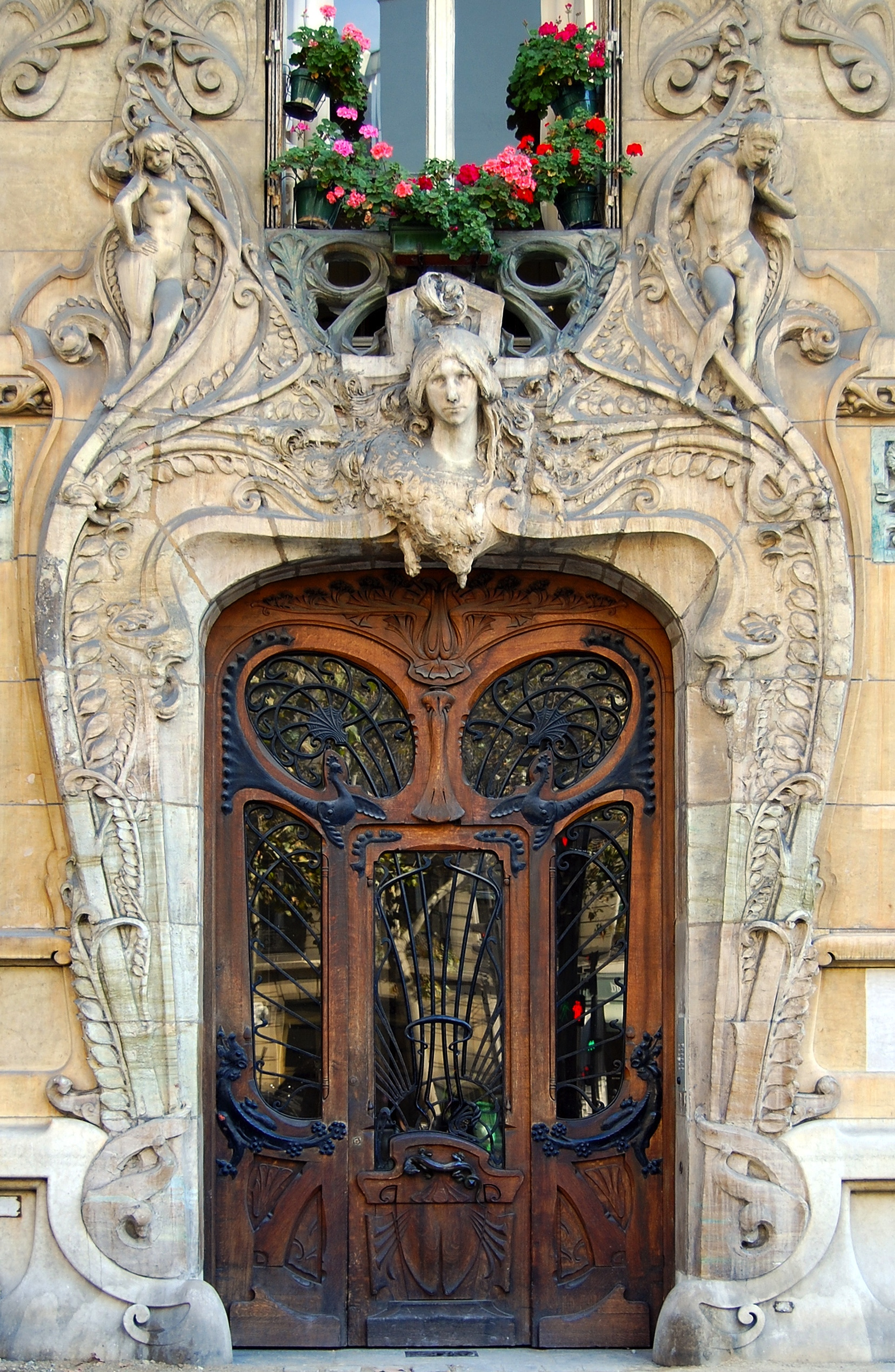
Art Nouveau building in Paris by architect Jules Lavirotte, sculptures by Jean-François Larrivé (1875–1928)

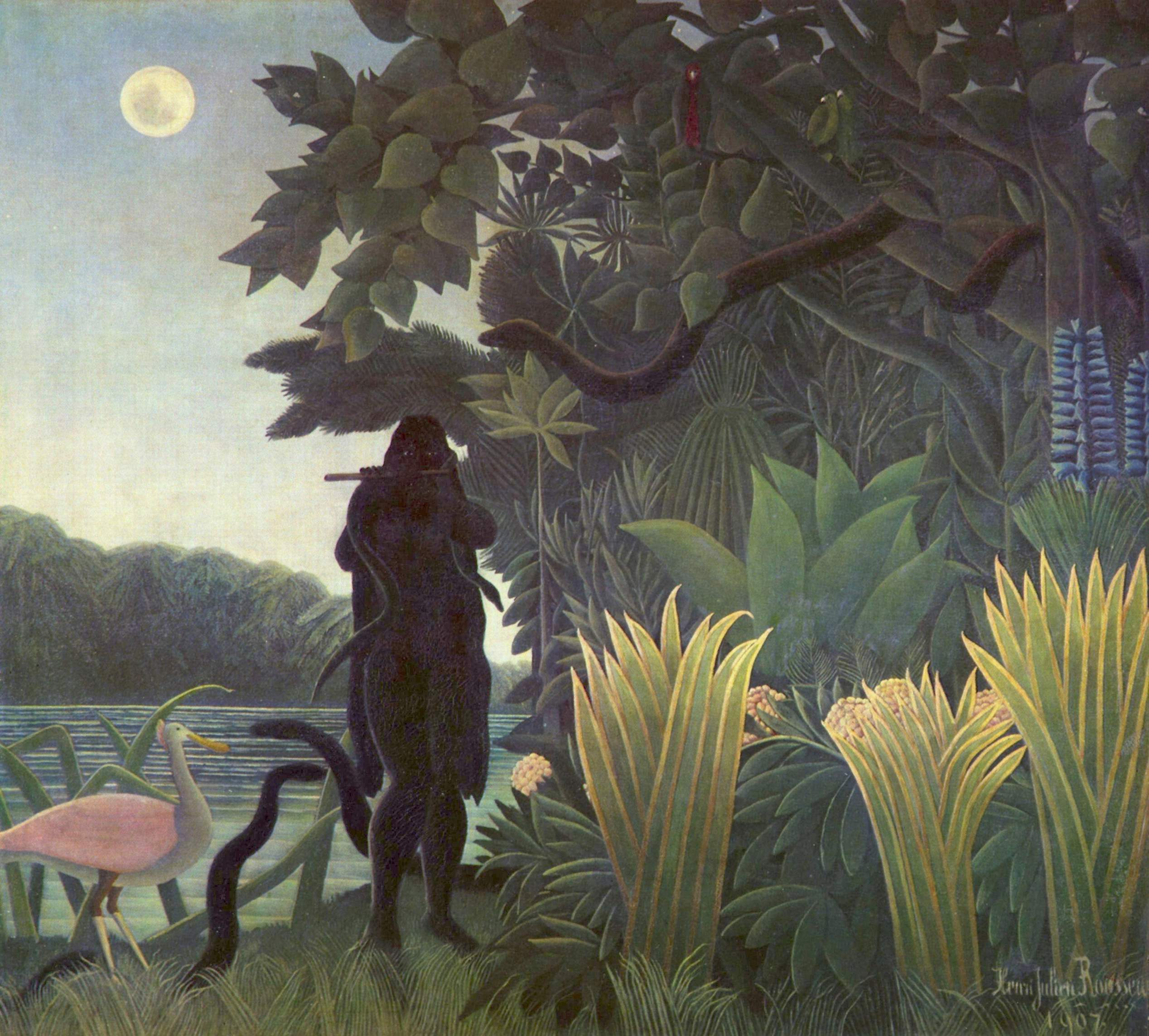
La charmeuse de Serpents (The Snake-Charmer) (1907) by Henri Rousseau

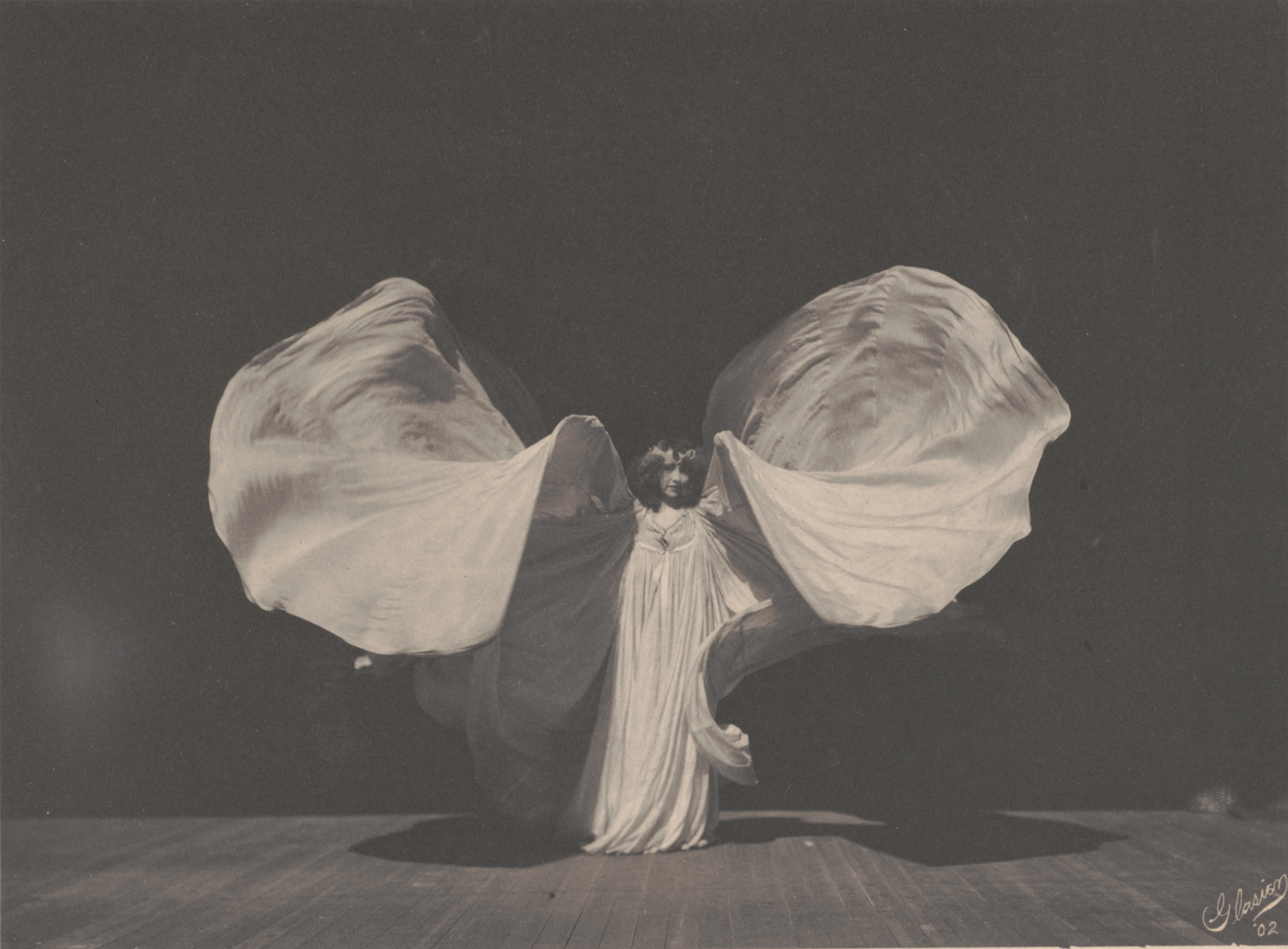
Modern dance (and modern stage lighting) innovator Loie Fuller

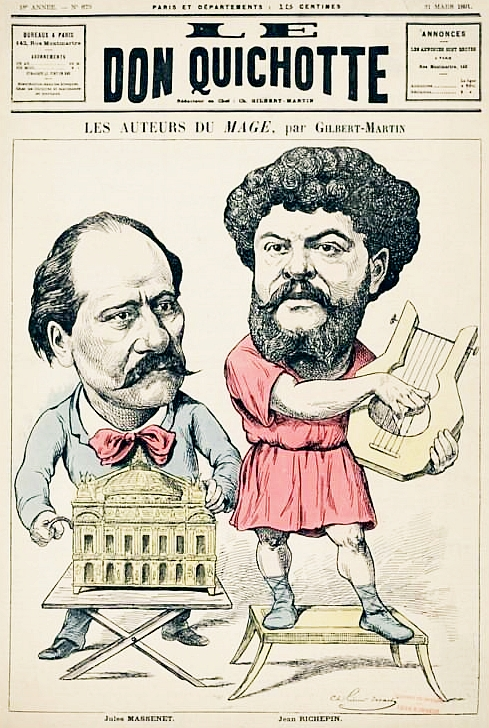
Jules Massenet and Jean Richepin (the latter as Apollo Citharoedus), authors of Le mage, premiered at the Opéra-Comique in Paris on 16 March 1891.

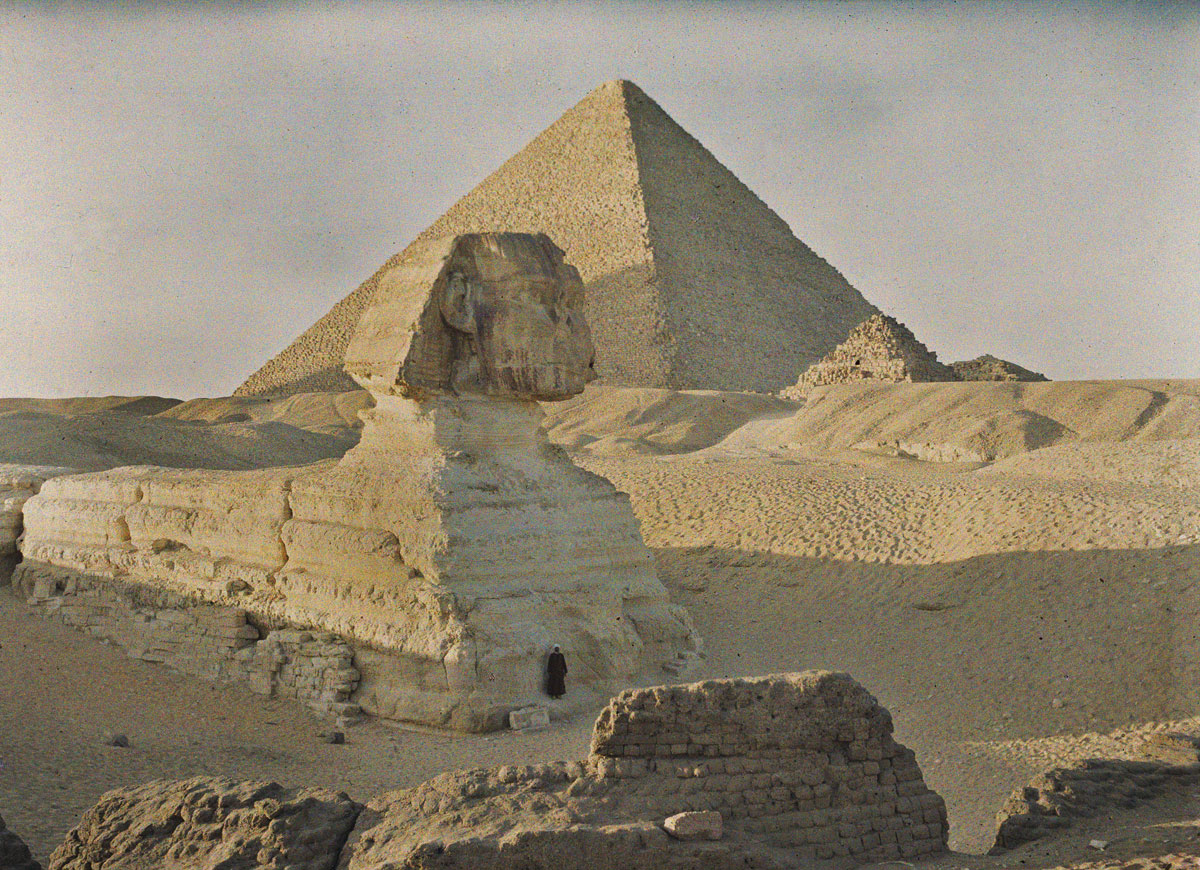
Autochrome Lumière was invented in 1907 as a pioneering method for color photography. Here the Giza pyramid complex photographed in 1914.

== See also ==
- Années folles
- Charles Ayrout, Belle Époque architect in Cairo, Egypt
- Brazilian Belle Époque
- Catalan modernism
- Generation of '80
- Concert of Europe
- Edwardian era
- Fin de siècle
- Gay Nineties
- Gilded Age
- Paris architecture of the Belle Époque
- Paris in the Belle Époque
- Second Industrial Revolution
- Succès de scandale
- Victorian era
