= William Rae =

William Rae may refer to:

- Sir William Rae, 3rd Baronet (1769–1842), Scottish Lawyer and Member of Parliament
- William Rae (bishop) (died 1367), Bishop of Glasgow
- Willie Rae, Chief Constable of Strathclyde Police
- William Rae (English footballer), English footballer who played for Glossop North End F.C. in 1901
- Willie Rae (footballer, born 1924) (1924–1982), Scottish footballer (Rangers FC, Queen of the South)
- William Rae (Hamilton), Scottish footballer who played for Hamilton Academical F.C.
- William Archibald Rae (1875–1943), businessman and provincial level politician from Alberta, Canada
- William Fraser Rae (1835–1905), Scottish journalist and author
- William Rae (firefighter) (1869–1904)
- William Rae (surgeon) (1786–1873), Scottish naval surgeon

== See also ==
- William Ray (disambiguation)
- William Wray (disambiguation)
