= Bill Ray =

Bill Ray may refer to:

- Bill Ray (bishop) (born 1950), Anglican bishop of North Queensland in Australia
- Bill Ray (politician) (1922–2013), American businessman, politician, and writer
- Bill Ray (photojournalist) (1936–2020), photojournalist

== See also ==
- William Ray (disambiguation)
- Billy Ray (disambiguation)
