= William Wray =

William Wray may refer to:

== People ==
- Sir William Wray, 1st Baronet, of Glentworth (c. 1555–1617), English politician
- Sir William Wray, 1st Baronet, of Ashby (1625–1669), English politician
- William Wray (artist) (born 1956), American cartoonist and landscape painter
- William Fitzwater Wray (died 1938), cycling journalist
- William Wray (politician) (1876–1946), American politician in the state of Washington
- William J. Wray (1845-1919), American soldier and Medal of Honor recipient
- Bill Wray (musician), American musician, composer and producer

== Other uses ==
- Sir William Wray (song), by The Fall

== See also ==
- William Ray (disambiguation)
- William Rae (disambiguation)
