= Senator Wray =

Senator Wray may refer to:

- Albert A. Wray (1858–1924), New York State Senate
- William Wray (politician) (1876–1946), Washington State Senate
