= Bartlane system =

The Bartlane system was a wirephoto technique invented in 1920 to transmit digitized newspaper images over submarine cable lines between London and New York. Named after its inventors Harry G. Bartholomew and Maynard D. McFarlane, it was the first digital imaging system ever invented. It was first used to transmit a picture across the Atlantic in 1921. Using the Bartlane system, images could be transmitted across the Atlantic in less than three hours. The images were initially coded with 5 gray levels, but this number was increased to 15 in 1929. At the transmitter, the pattern on the telegraph tapes were made using special printing devices and decoded into the image at the receiver using telegraph printers equipped with appropriate typefaces.

This system was also adapted with a photographic process in order to get more precise images in 1929, so that at the receiver the images were converted to a chemical medium.
