= Billy Ray =

Billy Ray can refer to:

- Billy Ray (screenwriter) (born 1962), American screenwriter and film director

Billy Ray is also the given name of:

- Billy Ray Adams (1938–2023), American college football player
- Billy Ray Barnes (born 1935), American former NFL player
- Billy Ray Bates (born 1956), American retired NBA player
- Billy-Ray Belcourt, Canadian indigenous poet, scholar, and author
- Billy Ray Brown (born 1963), American former professional golfer
- Billy Ray Cyrus (born 1961), American country musician and actor
- Billy Ray "Bill" Foster (1932–2011), American television director
- Billy Ray Hamilton (1949–2007), American convicted murderer
- Billy Ray Hearn (1929–2015), American Christian music label founder
- Billy Ray Irick (1958–2018), American convicted murderer
- Billy Ray Latham (1938–2018), American banjo player
- Billy Ray Locklin (1936–2019), American CFL player
- Billie Ray Martin, German female singer and songwriter
- Billy Ray Robles (born 1992), Filipino MPBL player
- Billy Ray Smith (disambiguation)
- Billy Ray Thunder (born 1954), African American professional rodeo cowboy
- Billy Ray Waldon (born 1952), Native American activist and former fugitive
- Billy Ray White (1936–2018), American politician

== See also ==
- Billy Ray Valentine, in the 1983 US comedy film Trading Places, played by Eddie Murphy
- Bill Ray (disambiguation)
- William Ray (disambiguation)
- Billy Rayner (1935–2006), Australian rugby league footballer
- Billy Reay (1918–2004), Canadian NHL player
