= William Ray =

William Ray may refer to:

- Will Ray (born 1950), American guitarist
- William Ray (medicine) (1884–1953), academic in Adelaide, South Australia
- William Ray (Oregon politician), member of the Oregon Territorial Legislature, 1856
- William H. Ray (1812–1881), United States Representative from Illinois
- William Hallett Ray (1825–1909), Canadian politician, farmer, and merchant
- William M. Ray II (born 1963), American judge
- Sir William Ray (British politician), Leader of London County Council, 1925–1934, MP for Richmond, 1932–1937
- William Francis Ray, politician from Franklin, Massachusetts.
- Bill Ray (bishop), 10th Anglican Bishop of North Queensland, Australia
- Billy Ray (screenwriter), screenwriter, director, and producer

== See also ==
- William Rae (disambiguation)
- William Wray (disambiguation)
- Bill Ray (disambiguation)
- Billy Ray (disambiguation)
