= Bill Ray (photojournalist) =

American photojournalist (1936–2020)

- Self portrait of Bill Ray, taken in 1965 aboard the carrier USS Midway located off the coast of Vietnam
- Born: William Robert Ray; February 16, 1936; Columbus, Nebraska
- Died: January 8, 2020 (aged 83); Manhattan
- Known for: Photojournalism

Bill Ray (1936–2020) was an American photojournalist whose long career included twelve years of work for Life magazine spanning the 1960s. He was responsible for extensive photo essays and issue covers. His subjects ranged broadly from celebrities to international conflicts, social upheavals, and fads of the moment and he became known for the persistence and ingenuity he put into obtaining photos that possessed both immediacy and lasting artistic value. At the time of his death some of his best known work did not appear in publications but was shown in gallery exhibitions. Examples include a photo of Marilyn Monroe singing the happy birthday song to John F. Kennedy in Madison Square Garden (1962), an extensive shoot of the Hells Angels motorcycle gang (1965), Ray Charles at Carnegie Hall (1966), and both on- and off-field photos of the first Super Bowl (1967).

== Early life ==
Ray was born in Columbus, Nebraska, and grew up in the neighboring village of Shelby, where he was educated in local public schools. Encouraged by his mother, he adopted photography as a hobby at the age of eleven and within a year was developing and printing photos that he had taken with a medium format Speed Graphic camera that he had been given. Once a week his parents drove him 90 miles east to attend meetings of the Omaha Camera Club. (Note: Founded in 2915, the Omaha Camera Club provided a meeting place for enthusiasts, sponsored demonstrations and guest speakers, participated in exchanges with other clubs, and held occasional exhibitions. It was still active in January 2020, having its own website and presence on Facebook and SmugMug.) When he was sixteen a local newspaper published a photo he had taken showing the last passenger train that would stop in his home town.

== Career as a journalist ==
Bill Ray: "The Great Decision," news photo that originally appeared on November 20, 1954, in the Lincoln Evening Journal & Nebraska State Journal and within a few days was re-published in 600 newspapers across the country

The following year, just after his high school graduation, Ray was hired as a journalist for the Lincoln Journal. In November 1954, less than twelve months after he began work at the paper, a photo of his (shown at right) was distributed as a wirephoto to hundreds of papers across the country. Appearing with the caption "The Great Decision," it showed a toddler holding a hand ax eyeing a turkey. Ray held his camera close to the ground making it appear that the turkey and boy were about the same size. (Note: Then just shy of his second birthday, the boy was a member of the family in whose home Ray boarded. The photo appeared on the Saturday preceding the Thanksgiving holiday.) The recognition Ray received for taking it helped him obtain a job in the Chicago office of United Press International later that year. In 1958, after a short stint working at the Minneapolis Star and Tribune and subsequently turning down a job offer from National Geographic, Ray moved to New York to begin a freelance work for Life magazine. A year later he joined Life as a full-time member of the staff.

Bill Ray: Ringo Walked on this Grass, news photo that originally appeared on August 28, 1964, in a Life article on Beatlemania in San Francisco

While still free-lancing Ray took photos of jazz bassist, Charles Mingus at a club in Greenwich Village and Elvis Presley just before his departure to serve as an Army Private in Germany. A year later he did a photo shoot of Alan Freed's last television show as a payola scandal ended his career as a rock and roll disk jockey. In what would eventually become the most famous of his photo assignments, Ray worked his way backstage onto a catwalk to shoot Marilyn Monroe in a skintight dress signing the happy birthday song to John F. Kennedy on the occasion of his forty-fifth birthday at Madison Square Garden in 1962. (Note: Life did not print Ray's photos until years later in one of its special issues after it had ceased weekly publication. A clip of the performance is available on YouTube.) In 1963 Ray moved from New York to become a staff photographer in Life's Beverly Hills office. Soon after arriving he spent two months photographing the actress, Natalie Wood. A year later he took an arresting photo of a Beatles fan as the foursome arrived in Los Angeles for a west coast concert tour (shown at left). It showed a tearful girl holding a clump of grass and had the caption ""Ringo! Ringo walked on this grass!" (Note: A letter to the editor appeared in a subsequent issue. The writer, Carol Pinette of Brunswick, Maine, said, "the picture expresses all the heartfelt joy and immense feeling we Beatle fans have for our idols.") That year he also produced a photo essay on the founder of Japan's largest consumer electronics company, Konosuke Matsushita.

Bill Ray: A War Comes Home, news photo that originally appeared on August 12, 1966, in a Life article on mixed feelings concerning the Vietnam war in a small Ohio town

Bill Ray: Soviet Tanks on the Streets of Prague, news photo that originally appeared on August 30, 1968, in a Life article on the Soviet invasion that brought the Prague Spring to an end

In 1965 Life sent Ray to Asia to cover the war in Vietnam and tensions on the border between Tibet and Sikkim. The cover for August 6 showed the six-inch guns of a light cruiser bombarding Vietcong positions and a photo essay in that issue showed action on an aircraft carrier, including a two-page spread of sailors transferring a 2,000 lb bomb that had been received from a supply ship and another showing crew members from a destroyer checking out a suspicious fishing boat. In October of the same year, Ray was in Sikkim to photograph Chinese Red Army soldiers patrolling the Tibetan border of that Indian province. In 1966 Ray produced a photo essay in a small Ohio town from which a relatively large number of young men had been sent to fight in Vietnam. It included shots of a military funeral for a marine killed in action (shown at right) and photos of six families, standing next to their television sets, each set showing President Lyndon Johnson giving a press conference. In varying degrees they expressed doubts about the war and, as the accompanying text said, "doubted Johnson's optimistic appraisal of Vietnam." Before going to Massillon Ray made a photo essay showing the Watts section of Los Angeles as a follow-up to the previous summer's riots. In 1968 Ray was in Prague taking photographs of the Soviet invasion that brought the Prague Spring to an end. One of the images appeared in a double-page spread in the issue for August 30 (shown at left). The accompanying description said, "Suddenly, unbelievably, Soviet tanks were in the streets of Prague, and the brief idyll of liberation, the brave rebirth of national pride and expectation were at an end... Utterly astounded by the treachery and admonished by their leaders to offer no resistance, the Czech people could only gather with their flags in anguished crowds and hurl threats and a pitiful defiance against the steel of the invaders."

Bill Ray: A Lead Protestor Against the Vietnam War Drops Her Guard, news photo that originally appeared on April 23, 1971, in a Life article on the antiwar activism of actress Jane Fonda

Much of Ray's subsequent work for Life consisted of celebrity shoots. In 1967 he took cover and six pages of photos showing Ingrid Bergman preparing for a role in a Broadway play. A year later he accompanied the many paparazzi covering the Kennedy-Onassis wedding on Skorpiós. In 1969 he contributed photos of Sharon Tate and Roman Polanski to an article about her brutal murder. In 1971 he produced a cover story on the anti-war work of actress, Jane Fonda. Ray traveled with her for several weeks during which, he said, "she worked like a non-stop demon in a humorless and even grim manner." During that time he caught her in a pensive moment, relaxing briefly with her daughter, Vanessa (shown at right).

Interspersed with his celebrity coverage were special-interest features such as photographs of endangered wildlife taken during a three-month assignment in 1970 and a 1972 photo essay on the activities of a thirteen-year-old boy in Manhattan.

Bill Ray: Andy Warhol holding a life-size Polaroid portrait of himself, news photo that originally appeared in New York Magazine on June 16, 1972

Ray left Life after it ceased weekly publication in 1972. Over the next few years he did freelance work for other magazines, including Smithsonian, Archaeology, Fortune and Travel and Leisure. During that period he made 46 cover photos for Newsweek, including one of Andy Warhol that attracted more than usual attention. Ray took the Warhol photo in 1980 using a view camera that had been made by the Polaroid Corporation that was capable of producing instant photographs 22 1/2 × 30 inches from edge to edge. A critic said the photo (shown at left) was "a trenchant portrait of the master of replicated reality."

=== Exhibitions ===
Some of Ray's best known work did not appear in publications but was shown in gallery exhibitions. Examples include the photo of Marilyn Monroe singing the happy birthday song to John F. Kennedy in Madison Square Garden (1962), and his many photos of the Hells Angels motorcycle gang (1965), already mentioned. In addition he photographed Ray Charles at Carnegie Hall (1966) and both on- and off-field photos of the first Super Bowl (1967) in collections that Life decided not to publish.

In 1959 held his first solo exhibition at the Leica Gallery in New York. A critic noted that he was as yet only 22 years old and while the show seemed premature, there was "enough imaginative work to indicate that a new and refreshing talent has appeared on the photojournalistic scene." After his career had fully matured he participated in a group show held in 1998 at New York's James Danziger Gallery and a few years later was in another group show in New York, this one held at the Howard Greenberg Gallery. In 2003 he was given the first of a number of retrospective solo exhibitions, this one at the Monroe Gallery of Photography, Santa Fe, New Mexico Subsequent retrospective solo shows were mounted at the Leica Gallery (2006), the Museum of Nebraska Art (2012), and again at the Monroe Gallery (2014).

=== Photographic technique ===
Throughout his career Ray preferred available light photography, using artificial light only when unavoidable. An example he gave of the latter situation was the Kennedy-Onassis wedding when he found himself drenched by heavy rainfall and in danger of electric shock from his web strobe. (Note: He told a reporter: "The strobe, which was drenched at this point, fired about three times and then tried to electrocute me. Then Onassis jumps on a golf cart and tries to run over me and whoever else was there.") While freelancing after leaving Life he said many of the celebrity covers he made for Newsweek were also done with strobe. In a 2014 interview he said he developed his skill at composition, at capturing his subjects' expressions and body language, and at handling ambient lighting by studying works at local art museums. He also said he preferred unposed shots and learned early on that he had to work very quickly to capture the image that he wanted. Another time he said he was not fond of nature or travel photography but loved to do stories on people.

Although known for his many celebrity portraits in head-shot style, Ray was also adept at action photography. Soon after the dramatic escalation of the war in Vietnam in the early months of 1965 he photographed the big guns of an American light cruiser as they opened up on Viet Cong targets and brought his cameras into the cockpits during bombing runs by carrier-based warplanes (and once urged a pilot to fly so low that it skimmed the water). Later that year he was with Indian troops on the Sikkim border with Tibet. There, he convinced the patrol he accompanied to approach closer than they felt was safe so that he could get good photographs of Chinese soldiers patrolling on the other side of a small valley. A month later he embedded himself with a Hells Angels gang for four weeks taking road shots of them from the pillion seat of a motorcycle. Although his work in Vietnam and Sikkim resulted in major Life photo essays including a cover photo, the Hells Angels story was killed by a Life editor who reportedly said "I don't want these smelly bastards in my magazine."(Ironically, after they appeared in exhibitions these photos emerged as some of Ray's most popular work.)

Ray's parents supported his early fascination with photography by buying him cameras and transporting him from the village where they lived so that he could attend weekly meetings of the Omaha Camera Club. His first camera was a 35mm Kodak purchased in a local drugstore. When he was eleven, in 1947, they bought him his first press camera, a 2 1/4-inch × 3 1/4-inch Speed Graphic. He went on to own and use many other cameras, including Leicas, Rolleiflexes, Linhofs, and Hasselblads. He would carry more than one of the smaller cameras with him during assignments. The larger view cameras were generally reserved for studio work, the largest of all—the giant Polaroid camera, already mentioned, was not in any sense portable. Most of his early work came from the 4-inch × 5-inch Graphlex camera that most press photographers used at the time. When asked why he chose that camera over the many 35mm cameras then available, he said in practice the bulky Graphlex with its plate holders and effective limit of four images per shoot produced quicker results since the plates could be quickly developed (sometimes in a hotel bathtub) and "wet printed" to photo sensitive paper. He put it this way, "for most assignments, you shoot just one or two holders, and you come rushing in and soup that, and you can print a 4 × 5 negative wet. (Note: Wet printing shortened the time it took to print a photograph. After minimal processing, the wet negative was mounted in a glassless carrier. The carrier was placed directly over a sheet of photopaper. Light projected through the negative then transferred a latent image to the paper.) After those early years, most of his later work for Life was done in 35mm or 2 1/4-inch × 2 1/4-inch format on the Leicas, Rolleiflexes, Linhofs, and Hasselblads. While the early work was necessarily in black and white, the later was usually in color.

Although he used the collections of art museums to help him understand composition, the use of figures in painting, and the importance of light, Ray maintained that his photojournalism was not high art—not, he said, an art in the sense of a Renaissance art, no." (Note: The quote comes from an interview with John Loengard in 1993. He said in full: "I've never thought I was competing with Michelangelo or Rubens, or anyone like that. Somehow photographers seem elevated to a higher standard than a really good carpenter, which is probably a big mistake. Anything's an art these days, so why not? Go over to the Whitney Museum. But certainly not a high art. Not an art in the sense of a Renaissance art, no. I always did the best I could. I think I did some good pictures and that's it.") Nonetheless, as Grace Glueck, a critic for The New York Times wrote, Ray's work was "in and of the moment, but it reaffirms that photojournalism is an art all its own."

== Personal life and family ==
Ray was born on February 16, 1936, in Columbus, Nebraska. His father was George Webster Ray (1889–1960), who owned a lumber yard. His mother was Waunita Williams Ray (born about 1896), an amateur painter. He had three siblings, all much older than he: two brothers, James W. Ray (born about 1921) and George W. Ray (born about 1929), and a sister, Bess A. Ray (born about 1924). He grew up in the small village of Shelby, Nebraska, where, as noted, he attended public schools and then the University of Nebraska. Ray said his childhood was a good one. He told an interviewer, "Both my parents were just perfect. I had a terrific childhood. My mom was very busy with her art and loved the idea of my pursuing something like that. We were not by any means wealthy, but she always found money if I needed a camera."

In 1958 he married Marlys J. Greshwalk and had been married to her for 61 years at the time of his death. As well as housewife and mother, Marlys was Ray's assistant, handling such chores as loading his cameras and recording data about his photographs. Beginning in 1972, when he resumed freelancing after the demise of the weekly Life, she was his agent as well. Regarding her work he said "she was the fastest there was at loading a Hasselblad, and she always kept the film straight. You have to know which roll is which, because I would say, 'We're going to push this roll a half [in development time to increase contrast],' or whatever. Under pressure, you have the president or Moshe Dayan and only a limited amount of time, so you really shoot like hell. We traveled a lot. We spent months in Japan, and we traveled for about 10 months with Carl Sagan around the world." The couple had three daughters, Hilary, Ashley, Sabrina.

Ray died January 8, 2020, from a heart attack at his New York City home. He was 83 years old.
