= Édouard Belin =

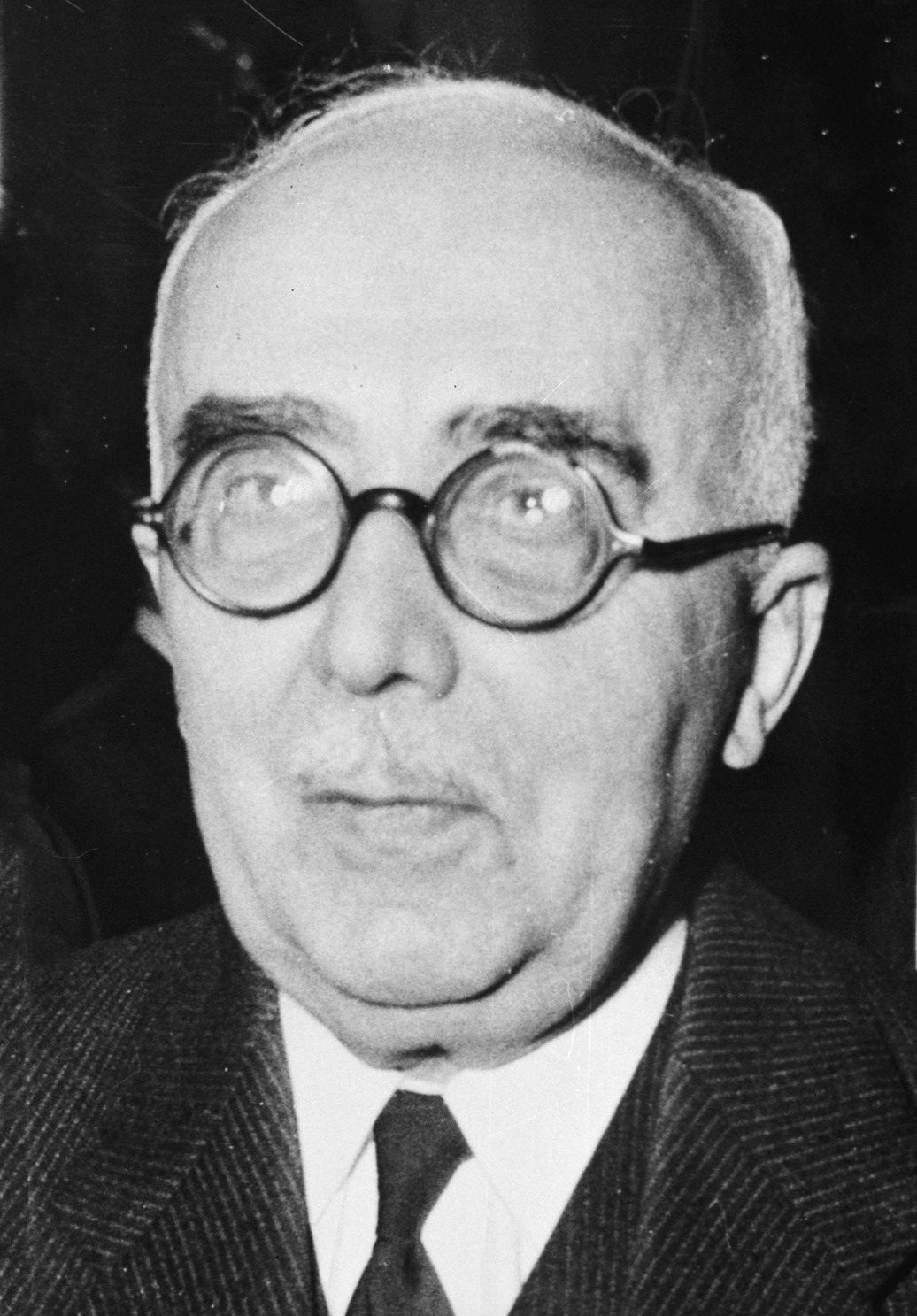
Édouard Belin

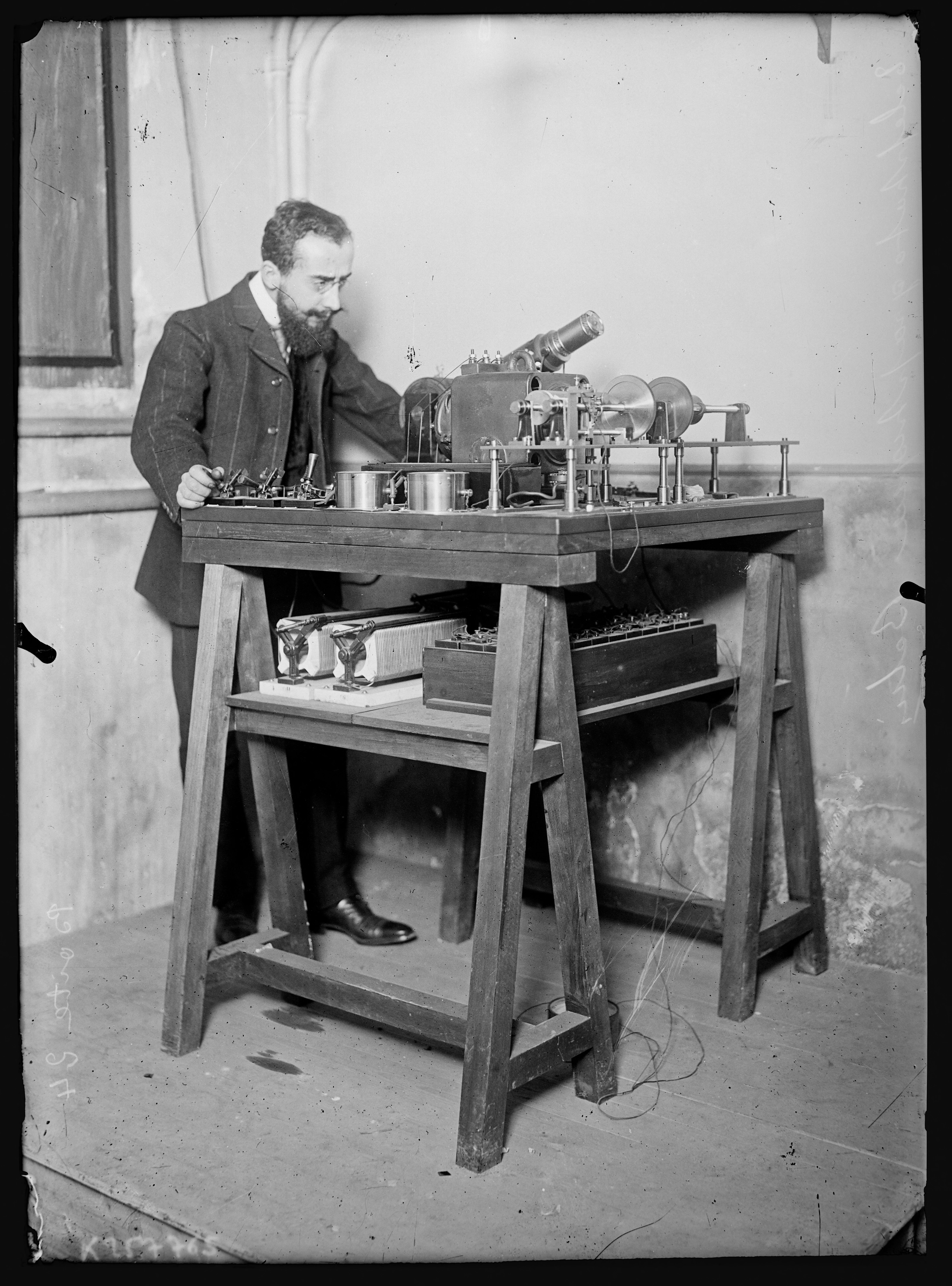
Édouard Belin receiving a telegraph

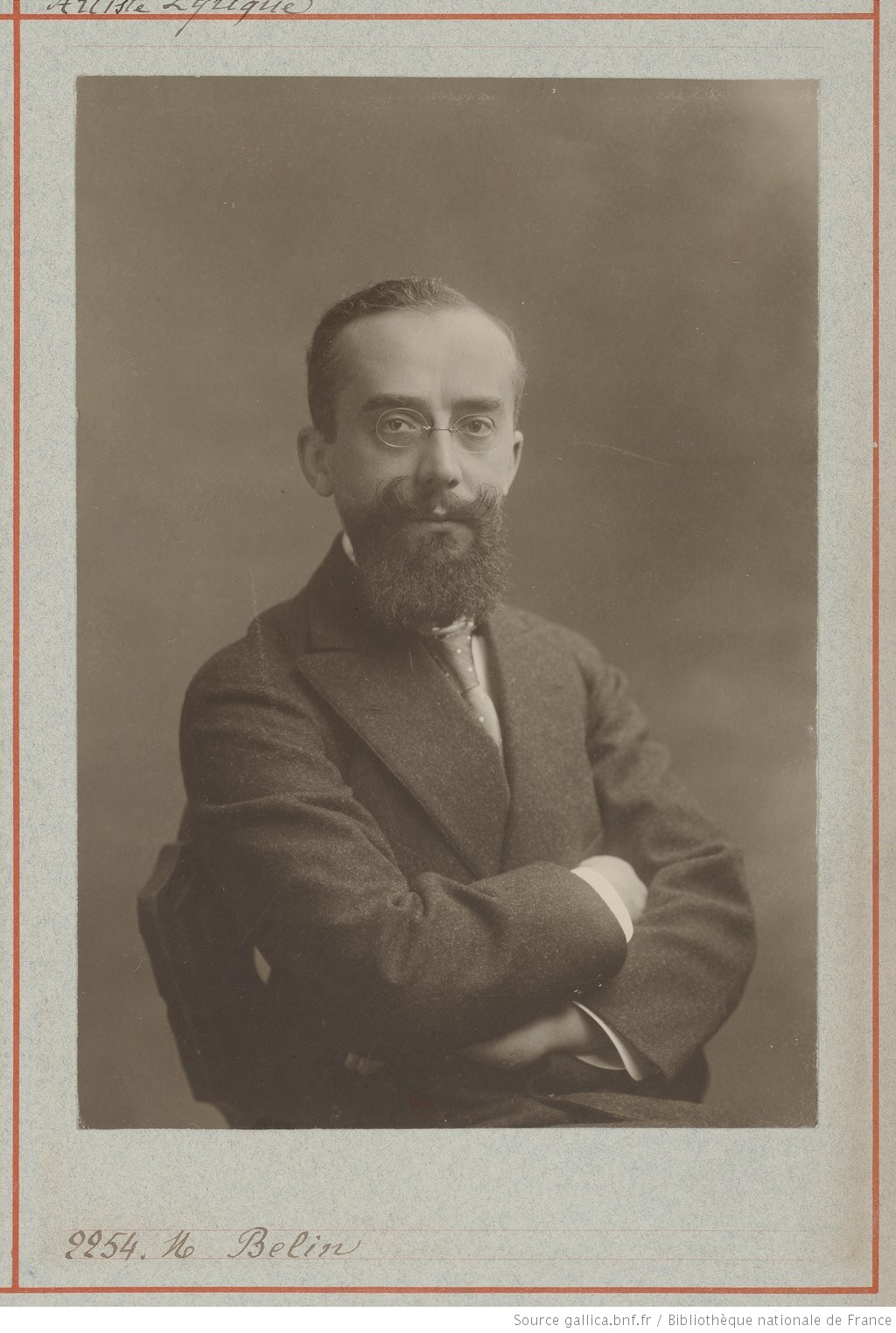
Early portrait of Édouard Belin

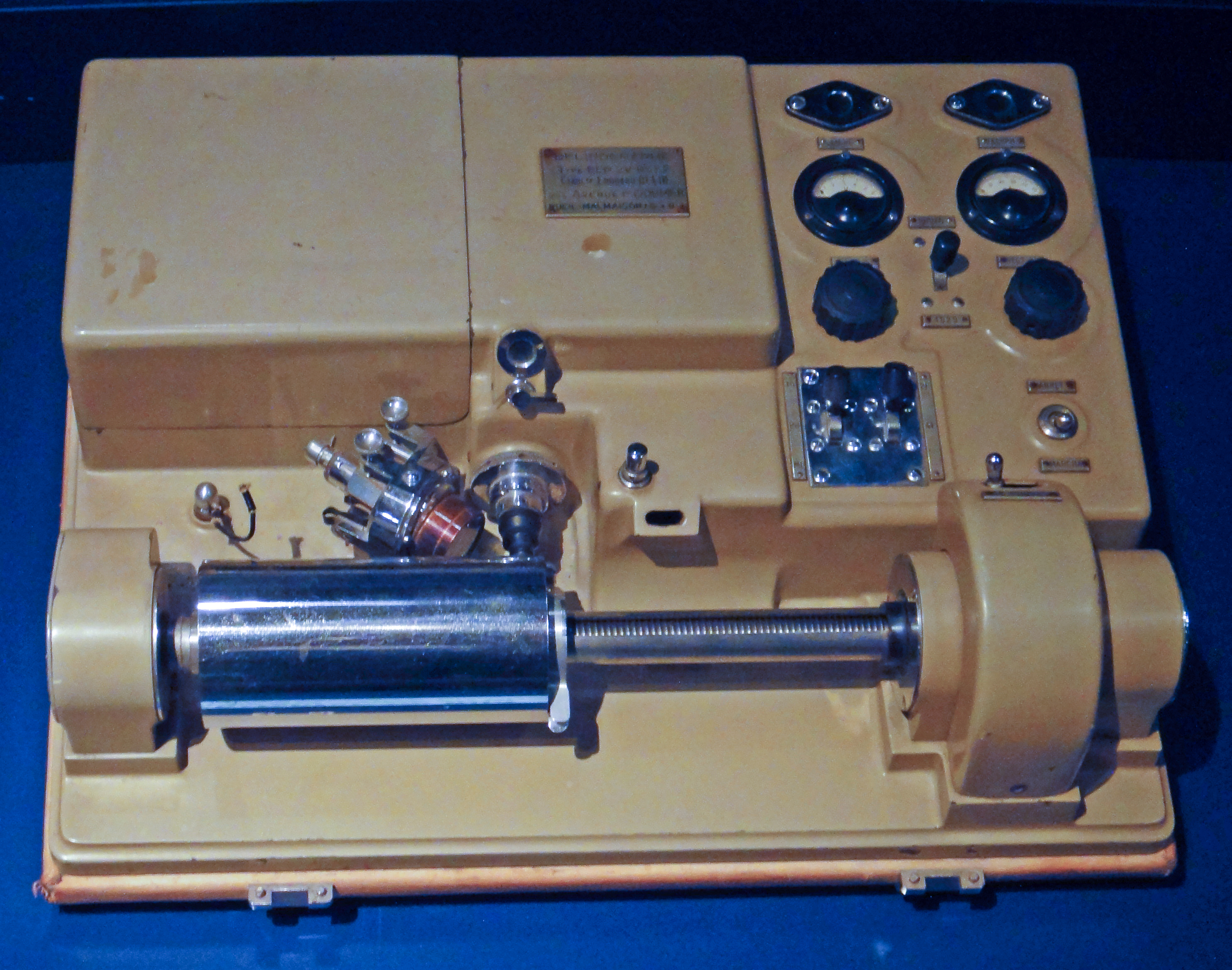
Belinograph BEP2V wirephoto machine from 1953

Édouard Belin (5 March 1876 – 4 March 1963) was a French photographer and inventor. In 1907 Belin invented a phototelegraphic apparatus called the Bélinographe (télestéréographe)—a system for receiving photographs over telephone wires via telegraphic networks.

Belin's invention had been used for journalistic photos since 1914, and the process was improved by 1921 to enable transmission of images by radio waves.

From 1926, Belin worked on a television apparatus. In 1926, with Holweg, he tested the capacity for the eye to perceive pictures proposed at a very high speed, using a mirror drum.

Belin was born in Vesoul, Haute-Saône, France, and died, aged 86, in Territet, Canton of Vaud, Switzerland.

== Bélinographe ==
In this apparatus, the transmitter traverses the original image point by point. At each point a measurement of light intensity is made with an electric eye. The measurement is conveyed to the receiver. There, a variable intensity light source reproduces the light measured by the electric eye, while carrying out same displacements exactly. By doing this, it exposes the photographic paper and makes it possible to obtain a copy of the original image.

Other scientists such as Arthur Korn had also been developing technology to transmit images over long distances.

Modern telecopiers and photocopiers use the same principle. With these devices, the source light intensity sensor was replaced by a CMOS sensor. The destination device that makes the photographic impression is based on either light or laser technology.

== Legacy ==
Belin gave his name to a high school of Vesoul, Haute-Saône, France.

== See also ==
- Display resolution
- Fax
- Gamma correction
- Image scanner
- Telegraphy § Facsimile
- Telerecording (UK)
- Wirephoto
