= William Rae (surgeon) =

Scottish naval surgeon (1786–1873)

- Born: 1786
- Died: 8 April 1873 (aged 86–87); Devonshire
- Occupation: Surgeon

Sir William Rae CB (1786 – 8 April 1873) was a Scottish naval surgeon.

== Biography ==
Rae was born in 1786. He was the son of Matthew Rae of Park-end, Dumfries. He was educated at Lochmaben and Dumfries, and afterwards graduated M.D. at Edinburgh University. In 1804 he entered the medical service of the East India Company, but in the following year was transferred as surgeon to the royal navy. He served first in the Culloden under Sir Edward Pellew (afterwards Lord Exmouth). In 1807, when in the Fox, he took part in the destruction of the Dutch ships at Gressic in Java. Subsequently, when the squadron was becalmed in the Bay of Bengal, he contrived an apparatus for distilling water. When attached to the Leyden in 1812–13 he was very successful in his treatment of the troops suffering from yellow fever at Cartagena and Gibraltar, and received the thanks of the commander-in-chief and the medical board.

In 1824 he was appointed to the Bermuda station. He became M.R.C.S. in 1811, extra-licentiate of the Royal College of Physicians in 1839, and F.R.C.S. in 1843. He ultimately attained the rank of inspector-general of hospitals and fleets, and retired on a pension to a country practice near Barnstaple. He was created C.B. in 1855, and knighted in 1858. He died at Hornby Lodge, Newton Abbot, Devonshire, on 8 April 1873, and was buried at Wolborough. Rae married, in 1814, Mary, daughter of Robert Bell; and secondly, in 1831, Maria, daughter of Assistant-commissary-general R. Lee.
