= William Wray (politician) =

American politician

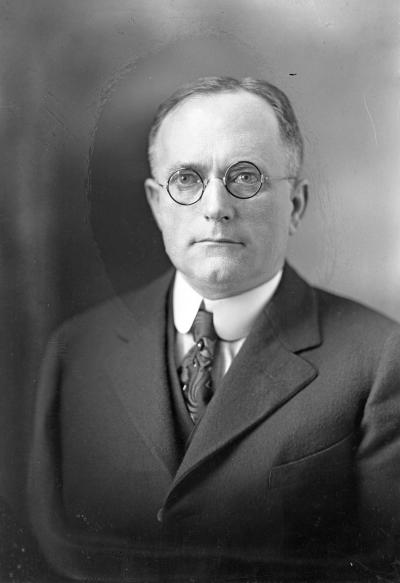
- Wray in 1923

Member of the Washington House of Representatives for the 43rd district
- In office 1911–1915

Member of the Washington State Senate for the 33rd district
- In office 1915–1933

Personal details
- Born: September 28, 1876 England
- Died: June 8, 1946 (aged 69) Walla Walla, Washington, United States
- Party: Republican

William Wray (September 28, 1876 – June 8, 1946) was an American politician in the state of Washington. He served in the Washington House of Representatives and Washington State Senate.
