= Tests of relativistic energy and momentum =

Tests of special relativity

Kinetic energy in special relativity and Newtonian mechanics. Relativistic kinetic energy increases to infinity when approaching the speed of light, thus no massive body can reach this speed.

Tests of relativistic energy and momentum are aimed at measuring the relativistic expressions for energy, momentum, and mass. According to special relativity, the properties of particles moving approximately at the speed of light significantly deviate from the predictions of Newtonian mechanics. For instance, the speed of light cannot be reached by massive particles.

Today, those relativistic expressions for particles close to the speed of light are routinely confirmed in undergraduate laboratories, and necessary in the design and theoretical evaluation of collision experiments in particle accelerators. See also Tests of special relativity for a general overview.

== Overview ==
Similar to kinetic energy, relativistic momentum increases to infinity when approaching the speed of light.

In classical mechanics, kinetic energy and momentum are expressed as

$$E_{k}=\tfrac{1}{2}mv^{2} ,\quad p=mv . \,$$

On the other hand, special relativity predicts that the speed of light is constant in all inertial frames of references. The relativistic energy–momentum relation reads:

$$E^{2}-(pc)^{2}=(mc^{2})^{2} \,$$,

from which the relations for rest energy $E_{0}$, relativistic energy (rest + kinetic) $E$, kinetic energy $E_{k}$, and momentum $p$ of massive particles follow:

$$E_{0}=mc^{2},\quad E=\gamma mc^{2},\quad E_{k}=(\gamma-1)mc^{2},\quad p=\gamma mv$$,

where $\gamma=1/\sqrt{1-(v/c)^{2}}$. So relativistic energy and momentum significantly increase with speed, thus the speed of light cannot be reached by massive particles. In some relativity textbooks, the so-called "relativistic mass" $M=\gamma m\,$ is used as well. However, this concept is considered disadvantageous by many authors, instead the expressions of relativistic energy and momentum should be used to express the velocity dependence in relativity, which provide the same experimental predictions.

== Early experiments ==
First experiments capable of detecting such relations were conducted by Walter Kaufmann, Alfred Bucherer and others between 1901 and 1915. These experiments were aimed at measuring the deflection of beta rays within a magnetic field so as to determine the mass-to-charge ratio of electrons. Since the charge was known to be velocity independent, any variation had to be attributed to alterations in the electron's momentum or mass (formerly known as transverse electromagnetic mass $m_{T}=m\gamma,$ equivalent to the "relativistic mass" $M$ as indicated above). Since relativistic mass is not often used anymore in modern textbooks, those tests can be described of measurements of relativistic momentum or energy, because the following relation applies:

$$\frac{M}{m}=\frac{p}{mv}=\frac{E}{mc^{2}}=\gamma$$

Electrons traveling between 0.25–0.75c indicated an increase of momentum in agreement with the relativistic predictions, and were considered as clear confirmations of special relativity. However, it was later pointed out that although the experiments were in agreement with relativity, the precision was not sufficient to rule out competing models of the electron, such as the one of Max Abraham.

Already in 1915, however, Arnold Sommerfeld was able to derive the Fine structure of hydrogen-like spectra by using the relativistic expressions for momentum and energy (in the context of the Bohr–Sommerfeld theory). Subsequently, Karl Glitscher simply substituted the relativistic expressions for Abraham's, demonstrating that Abraham's theory is in conflict with experimental data and is therefore refuted, while relativity is in agreement with the data.

== Precision measurements ==
Three data points of Rogers et al., in agreement with special relativity

In 1940, Rogers et al. performed the first electron deflection test sufficiently precise to definitely rule out competing models. As in the Bucherer-Neumann experiments, the velocity and the charge-mass-ratio of beta particles of velocities up to 0.75 c was measured. However, they made many improvements, including the employment of a Geiger counter. The accuracy of the experiment by which relativity was confirmed was within 1%.

An even more precise electron deflection test was conducted by Meyer et al. (1963). They tested electrons traveling at velocities from 0.987 to 0.99 c, which were deflected in a static homogenous magnetic field by which $p$ was measured, and a static cylindrical electric field by which $p^{2}/(m\gamma)$ was measured. They confirmed relativity with an upper limit for deviations of ~0.00037.

Also measurements of the charge-to-mass ratio and thus momentum of protons have been conducted. Grove and Fox (1953) measured 385 megaelectronvolts (61.7 picojoules) protons moving at ~0.7 c. Determination of the angular frequencies and of the magnetic field provided the charge-to-mass ratio. This, together with measuring the magnetic center, allowed to confirm the relativistic expression for the charge-to-mass ratio with a precision of ~0.0006.

However, Zrelov et al. (1958) criticized the scant information given by Grove and Fox, emphasizing the difficulty of such measurements due to the complex motion of the protons. Therefore, they conducted a more extensive measurement, in which protons of 660 MeV (106 pJ) with mean velocity of 0.8112 c were employed. The proton's momentum was measured using a Litz wire, and the velocity was determined by evaluation of Cherenkov radiation. They confirmed relativity with an upper limit for deviations of ~0.0041.

== Bertozzi experiment ==
Data of the Bertozzi experiment show close agreement with special relativity. Kinetic energy of five electron runs: 0.5, 1, 1.5, 4.5, 15 MeV (or 1, 2, 3, 9, 30 in mc²). Speed: 0.752, 0.828, 0.922, 0.974, 1.0 in c² (or 0.867, 0.910, 0.960, 0.987, 1 in c).

Since the 1930s, relativity was needed in the construction of particle accelerators, and the precision measurements mentioned above clearly confirmed the theory as well. But those tests demonstrate the relativistic expressions in an indirect way, since many other effects have to be considered in order to evaluate the deflection curve, velocity, and momentum. So an experiment specifically aimed at demonstrating the relativistic effects in a very direct way was conducted by William Bertozzi (1962, 1964).

He employed the electron accelerator facility at MIT in order to initiate five electron runs, with electrons of kinetic energies between 0.5 and 15 MeV (0.080 and 2.403 pJ). These electrons were produced by a Van de Graaff generator and traveled a distance of 8.4 m, until they hit an aluminium disc. First, the time of flight of the electrons was measured in all five runs – the velocity data obtained were in close agreement with the relativistic expectation. However, at this stage the kinetic energy was only indirectly determined by the accelerating fields. Therefore, the heat produced by some electrons hitting the aluminium disc was measured by calorimetry in order to directly obtain their kinetic energy. The error on all experimental measurements made was approximately 10%.

== Undergraduate experiments ==
Various experiments have been performed which, due to their simplicity, are still used as undergraduate experiments. Mass, velocity, momentum, and energy of electrons have been measured in different ways in those experiments, all of them confirming relativity. They include experiments involving beta particles, Compton scattering in which electrons exhibit highly relativistic properties and positron annihilation.

Beta particles
Marvel et al.	2011
Lund et al.	2009
Luetzelschwab	2003
Couch et al.	1982
Geller et al.	1972
Parker	1972
Bartlett et al.	1965

Compton recoil electrons
Jolivette et al.	1994
Hoffman	1989
Egelstaff et al.	1981
Higbie	1974

Positron annihilation
Dryzek et al.	2006

== Particle accelerators ==
In modern particle accelerators at high energies, the predictions of special relativity are routinely confirmed, and are necessary for the design and theoretical evaluation of collision experiments, especially in the ultrarelativistic limit. For instance, time dilation must be taken into account to understand the dynamics of particle decay, and the relativistic velocity addition theorem explains the distribution of synchrotron radiation. Regarding the relativistic energy-momentum relations, a series of high precision velocity and energy-momentum experiments have been conducted, in which the energies employed were necessarily much higher than the experiments mentioned above.

=== Velocity ===
Time of flight measurements have been conducted to measure differences in the velocities of electrons and light at the SLAC National Accelerator Laboratory. For instance, Brown et al. (1973) found no difference in the time of flight of 11 GeV (1.8 nJ) electrons and visible light, setting an upper limit of velocity differences of $\Delta v/c=(-1.3\pm2.7)\times10^{-6}$. Another SLAC experiment conducted by Guiragossián et al. (1974) accelerated electrons up to energies of 15 to 20.5 GeV (2.40 to 3.28 nJ). They used a radio frequency separator (RFS) to measure time-of-flight differences and thus velocity differences between those electrons and 15 GeV (2.4 nJ) gamma rays on a path length of 1,015 m. They found no difference, increasing the upper limit to $\Delta v/c=2\times10^{-7}$.

Already before, Alväger et al. (1964) at the CERN Proton Synchrotron executed a time of flight measurement to test the Newtonian momentum relations for light, being valid in the so-called emission theory. In this experiment, gamma rays were produced in the decay of 6 GeV (0.96 nJ) pions traveling at 0.99975 c. If Newtonian momentum $p=mv$ were valid, those gamma rays should have traveled at superluminal speeds. However, they found no difference and gave an upper limit of $\Delta v/c=10^{-5}$.

=== Energy and Calorimetry ===
The intrusion of particles into particle detectors is connected with electron–positron annihilation, Compton scattering, Cherenkov radiation etc., so that a cascade of effects is leading to the production of new particles (photons, electrons, neutrinos, etc.). The energy of such particle showers corresponds to the relativistic kinetic energy and rest energy of the initial particles. This energy can be measured by calorimeters in an electrical, optical, thermal, or acoustical way.

Thermal measurements in order to estimate the relativistic kinetic energy were already carried out by Bertozzi as mentioned above. Additional measurements at SLAC followed, in which the heat produced by 20 GeV (3.2 nJ) electrons was measured in 1982. A beam dump of water-cooled aluminium was employed as calorimeter. The results were in agreement with special relativity, even though the accuracy was only 30%. However, the experimentalists alluded to the fact, that calorimetric tests with 10 GeV (1.6 nJ) electrons were executed already in 1969. There, copper was used as beam dump, and an accuracy of 1% was achieved.

In modern calorimeters called electromagnetic or hadronic depending on the interaction, the energy of the particle showers is often measured by the ionization caused by them. Also excitations can arise in scintillators (see scintillation), whereby light is emitted and then measured by a scintillation counter. Cherenkov radiation is measured as well. In all of those methods, the measured energy is proportional to the initial particle energy.

=== Annihilation and pair production ===
Relativistic energy and momentum can also be measured by studying processes such as annihilation and pair production. For instance, the rest energy of electrons and positrons is 0.51 MeV (0.082 pJ) respectively. When a photon interacts with an atomic nucleus, electron-positron pairs can be generated in case the energy of the photon matches the required threshold energy, which is the combined electron-positron rest energy of 1.02 MeV (0.163 pJ). However, if the photon energy is even higher, then the exceeding energy is converted into kinetic energy of the particles. The reverse process occurs in electron-positron annihilation at low energies, in which process photons are created having the same energy as the electron-positron pair. These are direct examples of $E_0=mc^2$ (mass–energy equivalence).

There are also many examples of conversion of relativistic kinetic energy into rest energy. In 1974, SLAC National Accelerator Laboratory accelerated electrons and positrons up to relativistic velocities, so that their relativistic energy $\gamma mc^{2}$ (i.e. the sum of their rest energy and kinetic energy) is significantly increased to about 1.5 GeV (0.24 nJ) each. When those particles collide, other particles such as the J/ψ meson of rest energy of about 3 GeV (0.48 nJ) were produced. Much higher energies were employed at the Large Electron–Positron Collider in 1989, where electrons and positrons were accelerated up to 45 GeV (7.2 nJ) each, in order to produce W and Z bosons of rest energies between 80 and 91 GeV (12.8 and 14.6 nJ). Later, the energies were considerably increased to 200 GeV (32 nJ) to generate pairs of W bosons. Such bosons were also measured using proton-antiproton annihilation. The combined rest energy of those particles amounts to approximately 0.938 GeV (0.1503 nJ) each. The Super Proton Synchrotron accelerated those particle up to relativistic velocities and energies of approximately 270 GeV (43 nJ) each, so that the center of mass energy at the collision reaches 540 GeV (87 nJ). Thereby, quarks and antiquarks gained the necessary energy and momentum to annihilate into W and Z bosons.

Many other experiments involving the creation of a considerable amount of different particles at relativistic velocities have been (and still are) conducted in hadron colliders such as Tevatron (up to 1 TeV (0.16 μJ)), the Relativistic Heavy Ion Collider (up to 200 GeV (32 nJ)), and most recently the Large Hadron Collider (up to 7 TeV (1.1 μJ)) in the course of searching for the Higgs boson.

== Nuclear reactions ==
The relation $E_0=mc^2$ can be tested in nuclear reactions, as the percent differences between the masses of the reactants and the products are big enough to measure; the change in total mass should account for the change in total kinetic energy. Einstein proposed such a test in the paper where he first stated the equivalence of mass and energy, mentioning the radioactive decay of radium as a possibility. The first test in a nuclear reaction, however, used the absorption of an incident proton by lithium-7, which then breaks into two alpha particles. The change in mass corresponded to the change in kinetic energy to within 0.5%.

A particularly sensitive test was carried out in 2005 in the gamma decay of excited sulfur and silicon nuclei, in each case to the non-excited state (ground state). The masses of the excited and ground states were measured by measuring their revolution frequencies in an electromagnetic trap. The gamma rays' energies were measured by measuring their wavelengths with gamma-ray diffraction, similar to X-ray diffraction, and using the well-established relation between photon energy and wavelength. The results confirmed the predictions of relativity to a precision of 0.0000004.
