= Walter Kaufmann (physicist) =

German physicist (1871–1947)

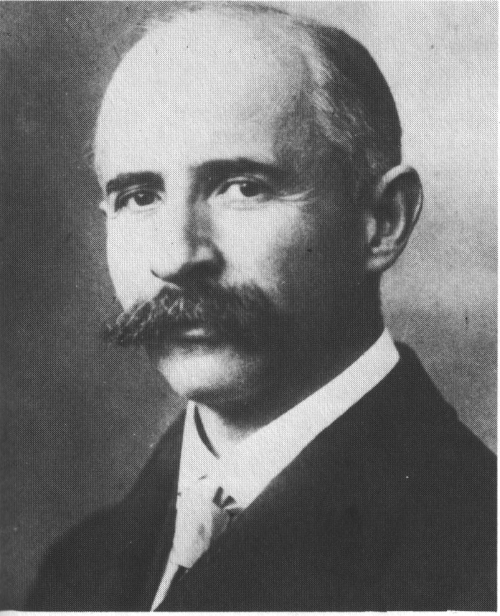
- Born: June 5, 1871; Elberfeld, German Empire
- Died: January 1, 1947 (aged 75); Freiburg im Breisgau, Germany
- Education: LMU Munich (doctorate)
- Known for: Kaufmann experiment
- Scientific career
- Fields: Experimental physics
- Workplaces: University of Bonn; University of Freiburg
- Thesis: Über die Bewegung geschlagener Saiten (1894)

Walter Kaufmann (June 5, 1871 – January 1, 1947) was a German physicist. He is best known for his experiment that led to the first experimental evidence of the velocity dependence of mass, which was an important contribution to the development of modern physics, including special relativity.

== Life ==
Of Jewish descent, in 1890/1891, Kaufmann studied mechanical engineering at the Technische Hochschulen in Chalottenburg and Munich. From 1892, he studied physics at the Universities of Berlin and Ludwig-Maximilians-Universität München (LMU), attaining a doctorate in 1894. From 1896, he was an assistant at the physical institutes of the Universities of Berlin and Göttingen. Kaufmann habilitated in 1899, and became a professor extraordinarius of physics at the University of Bonn. After further work at the Berliner Physikalisches Institut, he became professor ordinarius for experimental physics and leader of the physical institute at the Albertina in Königsberg, where he taught until he retired in 1935. Later, he was guest lecturer at the University of Freiburg.

== Measurements of velocity dependence of mass ==
Kaufmann's early work (1901–1903) confirmed for the first time the velocity dependence of the electromagnetic mass (later called relativistic mass) of the electron. However, the measurements were not accurate enough to differentiate between the Lorentz ether theory and that of Max Abraham.

At the end of 1905, Kaufmann carried out more accurate measurements. He was the first to discuss Albert Einstein's theory of special relativity, and argued that, although Einstein's theory is based on quite different conditions and is logically more satisfying, it is observationally equivalent to Lorentz's theory. Therefore, he spoke of the "Lorentz–Einstein" theory. It is notable that Kaufmann himself interpreted his experimental results as confirmation of Abraham's theory, refuting the Lorentz–Einstein principle of relativity. For some years, this weighed heavily against the latter. However, Kaufmann's results were criticized by Max Planck, Adolf Bestelmeyer (1906), and Walter Ritz (1908). The experiments were repeated by Alfred Bucherer (1908), Neumann (1914), and others, with results which appeared to confirm the Lorentz–Einstein theory and to disprove that of Abraham. However, it was pointed out later that the results were not accurate enough to distinguish between the theories. The uncertainty continued until 1940, when such experiments were accurate enough to rule out competing models. Today, the relativistic Lorentz-Einstein relations for momentum and energy are confirmed routinely in particle accelerators, see Tests of relativistic energy and momentum.

Note, however, that this uncertainty concerned only the relativistic mass of the electron. Even in 1917, investigations of the fine structure of the hydrogen lines provided confirmation of the Lorentz–Einstein formula, contradicting that of Abraham.

== See also ==
- History of special relativity

== Publications ==
- Kaufmann, W. (1901), "Die Entwicklung des Elektronenbegriffs", Physikalische Zeitschrift, 3 (1): 9–15
- —— (1901), "Die magnetische und elektrische Ablenkbarkeit der Bequerelstrahlen und die scheinbare Masse der Elektronen", Göttinger Nachrichten (2): 143–168
- —— (1902), "Über die elektromagnetische Masse des Elektrons", Göttinger Nachrichten (5): 291–296
- —— (1902), "Die elektromagnetische Masse des Elektrons", Physikalische Zeitschrift, 4 (1b): 54–56
- —— (1903), "Über die "Elektromagnetische Masse" der Elektronen", Göttinger Nachrichten (3): 90–103
- —— (1905), "Über die Konstitution des Elektrons", Sitzungsberichte der Königlich Preussischen Akademie der Wissenschaften (45): 949–956
- —— (1906), "Über die Konstitution des Elektrons", Annalen der Physik, 19 (3): 487–553, Bibcode:1906AnP...324..487K, doi:10.1002/andp.19063240303
