= Bestelmeyer =

Bestelmeyer is a surname. Notable people with the surname include:

- Adolf Bestelmeyer (1875–1957), German physicist
- German Bestelmeyer (1874–1942), German architect
