= Alfred Bucherer =

German physicist

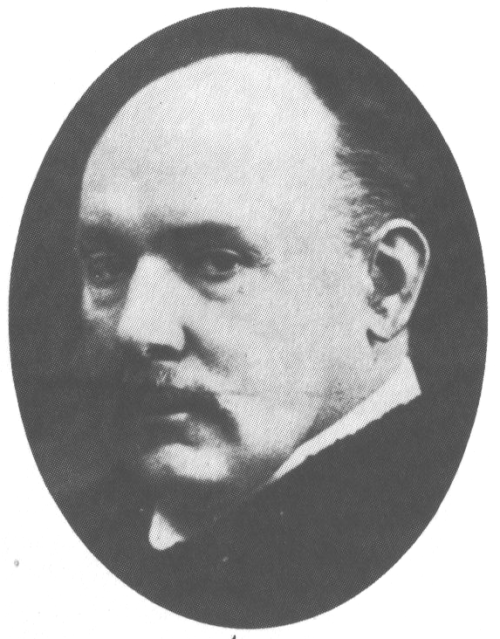
Alfred Bucherer

Alfred Heinrich Bucherer (* 9 July 1863 in Cologne; † 16 April 1927 in Bonn) was a German physicist, who is known for his experiments on relativistic mass. He also was the first who used the phrase "theory of relativity" for Einstein's theory of special relativity.

== Education ==
He studied from 1884 until 1899 at the University of Hannover, the Johns Hopkins University, the University of Strassburg, the University of Leipzig, and the University of Bonn. In Bonn he habilitated in 1899 and taught there until 1923.

In 1903 Bucherer published the first German-language book to be completely based on vector calculus.

== Theory of relativity ==
Like Henri Poincaré (1895, 1900), Bucherer (1903b) believed in the validity of the Principle of relativity, i.e. that all descriptions of electrodynamic effects should only contain the relative motion of bodies, not of the aether. However, he went a step further and even assumed the physical non-existence of the aether. Based on those ideas he developed a theory in 1906, which also included the assumption that the geometry of space is riemannian. But the theory was vaguely formulated and in 1908 Walther Ritz showed that Bucherer's theory leads to wrong conclusions with respect to electrodynamics. And contrary to Albert Einstein, he didn't connect his rejection of the aether with the relativity of space and time.

In 1904 he developed a theory of electrons in which the electrons contract in the line of motion and expand perpendicular to it. Independently of him Paul Langevin developed a very similar model in 1905. The Bucherer-Langevin model was an alternative to the electron models of:

- Hendrik Lorentz (1899), Henri Poincaré (1905, 1906) and Albert Einstein (1905). in which the electrons are subjected to length contraction without expansion in the other direction
- and the model of Max Abraham, in which the electron is rigid.

All three models predicted an increase of the electron mass if their velocities are approaching the speed of light. The Bucherer-Langevin model was quickly abandoned, so some experimentalists tried to distinguish between Abraham's theory and the Lorentz-Einstein theory by experiment. This was done by Walter Kaufmann (1901–1905) who believed that his experiments confirmed Abraham's theory, and disproved the Lorentz-Einstein theory. But in 1908 Bucherer conducted some experiments as well, and obtained results which seem to confirm the Lorentz-Einstein theory and the principle of relativity. With exceptions like Adolf Bestelmeyer with whom Bucherer had a polemical dispute, Bucherer's experiments were regarded as decisive. But it was shown in 1938 that all those experiments of Kaufmann, Bucherer, Neumann etc. showed only a qualitative increase in mass, but were too imprecise to distinguish between the different models. This lasted until 1940, when similar experimental equipments were sufficiently accurate to confirm the Lorentz-Einstein formula, see Kaufmann–Bucherer–Neumann experiments and Tests of relativistic energy and momentum.

Bucherer (1906) was the first who used — during some critical remarks on Einstein's theory — the expression "Einsteinian relativity theory / theory of relativity" ("Einsteinsche Relativitätstheorie"). This was based on Max Planck's term "relative theory" for the Lorentz-Einstein theory. And in 1908 Bucherer himself rejected his own version of the relativity principle, and accepted the "Lorentz-Einstein theory".

Later (1923, 1924), Bucherer criticized general relativity in some papers. However, this criticism was rejected because Bucherer misinterpreted Einstein's equivalence hypothesis.

== See also ==
- History of special relativity

== Publications ==
- Bucherer, A. H. (1896). "Die Wirkung des Magnetismus auf die electromotorische Kraft". Annalen der Physik. 294 (7): 564–578. Bibcode:1896AnP...294..564B. doi:10.1002/andp.18962940710.
- Bucherer, A. H. (1896). "Nachtrag zu: Die Wirkung des Magnetismus auf die electromotorische Kraft". Annalen der Physik. 295 (12): 735–741. Bibcode:1896AnP...295..735B. doi:10.1002/andp.18962951208.
- Bucherer, A. H. (1897). "Berichtigung zu "Magnetismus und electromotorische Kraft"" [Correction to 'Magnetism & Electromotive Force']. Annalen der Physik (in German). 297 (8): 807. Bibcode:1897AnP...297..807B. doi:10.1002/andp.18972970814.
- Bucherer, A. H. (1898). "Ueber osmotischen Druck". Annalen der Physik. 300 (3): 549–554. Bibcode:1898AnP...300..549B. doi:10.1002/andp.18983000307.
- Bucherer, A. H. (1900). "Zur Theorie der Thermoelektricität der Elektrolyte". Annalen der Physik. 308 (10): 204–209. Bibcode:1900AnP...308..204B. doi:10.1002/andp.19003081004.
- Bucherer, A. H. (1902). "Ueber das Kraftfeld einer sich gleichförmig bewegenden Ladung". Annalen der Physik. 313 (6): 326–335. Bibcode:1902AnP...313..326B. doi:10.1002/andp.19023130606.
- Bucherer, A. H. (1902). "Berichtigung". Annalen der Physik. 314 (9): 496. Bibcode:1902AnP...314..496B. doi:10.1002/andp.19023141015.
- Bucherer, A. H. (1903). Elemente der Vektor-Analysis mit Beispielen aus der theoretischen Physik. Leipzig: Teubner.
- Bucherer, A. H. (1903b). "Über den Einfluß der Erdbewegung auf die Intensität des Lichtes". Annalen der Physik. 316 (6): 270–283. Bibcode:1903AnP...316..270B. doi:10.1002/andp.19033160604.
- Bucherer, A. H. (1904). Mathematische Einführung in die Elektronentheorie. Leipzig: Teubner.
- Bucherer, A. H. (1905). "Das deformierte Elektron und die Theorie des Elektromagnetismus". Physikalische Zeitschrift. 6: 833–834.
- Bucherer, A. H. (1906). "Ein Versuch, den Elektromagnetismus auf Grund der Relativbewegung darzustellen". Physikalische Zeitschrift. 7: 553–557.
- Bucherer, A. H. (1907). "On a new Principle of Relativity in Electromagnetism". Philosophical Magazine. 13 (76): 413–421. doi:10.1080/14786440709463617.
- Bucherer, A. H. (1907). "The Action of Uniform Electric and Magnetic Fields on Moving Electrons". Philosophical Magazine. 13: 721. doi:10.1080/14786440709463650.
- Bucherer, A. H. (1908). "Messungen an Becquerelstrahlen. Die experimentelle Bestätigung der Lorentz-Einsteinschen Theorie" . Physikalische Zeitschrift. 9: 755–762.
- Bucherer, A. H. (1908). "On the Principle of Relativity and on the Electromagnetic Mass of the Electron. A Reply to Mr. Cunningham". Philosophical Magazine. 15 (87): 316–318. doi:10.1080/14786440809463774.
- Bucherer, A. H. (1909). "Die experimentelle Bestätigung des Relativitätsprinzips". Annalen der Physik. 333 (3): 513–536. Bibcode:1909AnP...333..513B. doi:10.1002/andp.19093330305.
- Bucherer, A. H. (1909). "Nachtrag zu meiner Arbeit: "Bestätigung des Relativitätsprinzips"". Annalen der Physik. 334 (10): 1063. Bibcode:1909AnP...334.1063B. doi:10.1002/andp.19093341011.
- Bucherer, A. H. (1909). "Antwort auf die Kritik des Hrn. E. Bestelmeyer bezüglich meiner experimentellen Bestätigung des Relativitätsprinzips". Annalen der Physik. 335 (15): 974–986. Bibcode:1909AnP...335..974B. doi:10.1002/andp.19093351506.
- Bucherer, A. H. (1910). "Erwiderung auf die Bemerkungen des Hrn. A. Bestelmeyer". Annalen der Physik. 338 (14): 853–856. Bibcode:1910AnP...338..853B. doi:10.1002/andp.19103381414.
- Bucherer, A. H. (1912). "Die neuesten Bestimmungen der spezifischen Ladung des Elektrons". Annalen der Physik. 342 (3): 597–598. Bibcode:1912AnP...342..597B. doi:10.1002/andp.19123420311.
- Bucherer, A. H. (1922). "Gravitation und Quantentheorie". Annalen der Physik. 373 (9): 1–10. Bibcode:1922AnP...373....1B. doi:10.1002/andp.19223730902.
- Bucherer, A. H. (1922). "Gravitation und Quantentheorie. II". Annalen der Physik. 373 (14): 545–550. Bibcode:1922AnP...373..545B. doi:10.1002/andp.19223731403.
- Bucherer, A. H. (1924). "Die Rolle des Standorts in der Relativitätstheorie. Eine Antwort auf die Kritik des Hrn. A. Wenzl". Annalen der Physik. 378 (5–6): 397–402. Bibcode:1924AnP...378..397B. doi:10.1002/andp.19243780506.
- Bucherer, A. H. (1924). "Berichtigung zur Arbeit "Die Rolle des Standorts in der Relativitätstheorie"". Annalen der Physik. 379 (9): 104. Bibcode:1924AnP...379..104B. doi:10.1002/andp.19243790906.
