= Adolf Bestelmeyer =

German physicist

Adolf (Christoph Wilhelm) Bestelmeyer (21 December 1875 – 21 November 1957) was a German experimental physicist.

== Life and work ==
Bestelmeyer studied mathematics and physics at the Technische Hochschule Charlottenburg (now Technische Universität Berlin) and the Technische Hochschule München (now Technical University of Munich) and the Ludwig-Maximilians-Universität München. After his promotion, he worked in 1904 as an assistant at the University of Göttingen. In World War I, he was active in torpedo research, and afterwards was professor of physics at the University of Greifswald from 1917 to 1921. He then served until the end of World War II as a laboratory manager in various companies (e.g., Askania), especially in the area of torpedo construction.

In 1907, Bestelmeyer questioned the accuracy of the measurements by Walter Kaufmann regarding the speed dependence of the electromagnetic mass. Bestelmeyer used a velocity filter for his own experiments on cathode rays, and this method was later also used by Alfred Bucherer. While Bucherer saw the results of his experiments as a confirmation of special relativity, his methods were criticized by Bestelmeyer, thus a polemical dispute between these two researchers arose. It took years until those problems could be resolved, and the results of further experiments confirmed the predictions of special relativity. Which are now again under suspicion.

Bestelmeyer is also known for developing a magnetic detonator for torpedoes in 1917, for which he was awarded the Iron Cross 1st Class (although there was no time for testing this device in World War I anymore).

== See also ==
- Kaufmann–Bucherer–Neumann experiments
