= Electromagnetic mass =

Physical concept

The electromagnetic mass of a system is the contribution of electromagnetic interactions to its inertia as calculated using classical electrodynamics. Different approaches to computing the electromagnetic mass give different answers. Electromagnetic mass, like inductance or the Abraham–Lorentz force, is a self-interaction phenomenon, in the sense that a charged body interacts with its own electromagnetic field. The concept first introduced in 1881 by Joseph J. Thomson.

== Physical origin ==
In classical mechanics a particle's momentum, $p$ is proportional to its velocity, $v$:
$$p = mv$$
where the constant of proportionality is the particle's mass,$m$. In classical electrodynamics a particle with charge like an electron might be modeled as a conducting sphere. As this sphere moves at non-relativistic speed in its own (radial) electric field, the interaction of the charge with the field gives an electromagnetic momentum:
$$p = \frac{2}{3}\frac{e^2}{ac^2}v$$
where $e$ is the elementary charge, $c$ is the speed of light, and $a$ is the radius of the particle. By comparison with the mechanical momentum, the electromagnetic mass of the spherical model of the electron can be defined:
$$m_{\textrm{elec}} = \frac{2}{3}\frac{e^2}{ac^2}$$
However, applying the same type of analysis to the electrostatic energy of the sphere produces another value for the electromagnetic mass:
$$m'_{\textrm{elec}} = \frac{1}{2}\frac{e^2}{ac^2}$$
Nevertheless, a charged conducting sphere is unstable without some other force to counteract the repulsion, and whatever that force might be would also contribute to mass.

=== Derivation based on self-force ===
A system consisting of two point electric charges q1 and q2 separated by a distance r is the simplest extended charge distribution, and it can be used to illustrate various approaches to computing the electromagnetic mass. In addition to the energy-based and momentum-based approaches, the self-force mass can be computed as follows.

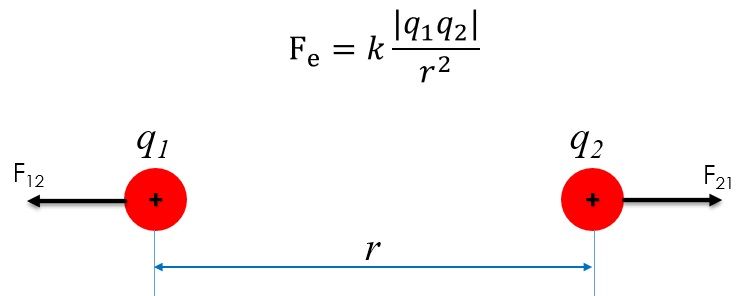

When this system of two point charges is at rest, the electric force exerted by q1 on q2 is equal and opposite to that exerted by q2 on q1 (Coulomb's law). If the pair of charges is now accelerated, with an acceleration $\vec{a}$ directed to the right (keeping the distance r between the two charges constant), this is no longer the case: since the electric field produced by each charge does not propagate instantaneously but at the speed of light (c = 299,792,458 m/s), the force experienced by each charge no longer depends on the current position of the other charge, but on its retarded position (t' = t − r/c). As a result, the force exerted by q2 on q1 becomes slightly stronger than the force exerted by q1 on q2. This imbalance leads to the appearance of a net force Fself acting on the whole system. This force is directed to the left and therefore tends to oppose the acceleration.

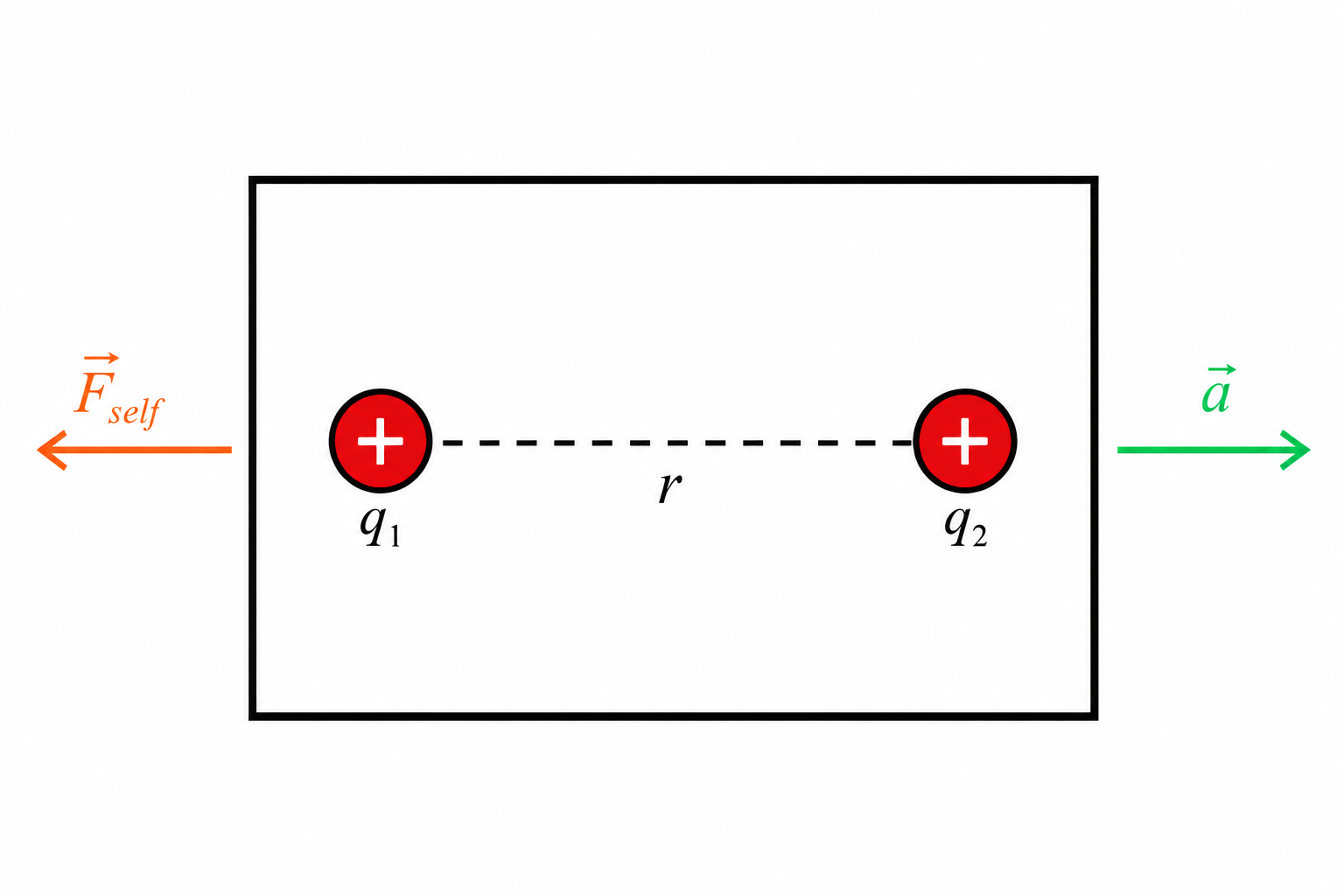

To calculate Fself, we need to compute the electric force exerted by each charge on the other, taking into account retardation effects in the propagation of the electric field. To do so, we can use the relation F = q E and compute the electric field E created by each charge using the Darwin model, which approximates field expressions to order 1/c² in the quasi-static approximation. The general expression for the field E is:

$\mathbf{E} = \frac{q}{4\pi \varepsilon_0} \left( \frac{\mathbf{n}}{r^2} - \frac{\mathbf{a} + (\mathbf{a}\cdot \mathbf{n})\,\mathbf{n}}{2c^2 r} \right)$

where all quantities are instantaneous (i.e. evaluated at the present time t). The first term represents the Coulomb field, and the second is a corrective term, caused by the acceleration of the charges, which precisely accounts for retardation effects.

As mentioned above, the first term (though much larger in magnitude than the second) yields equal and opposite forces. The acceleration-dependent term, however, can produce forces that are not equal and opposite. Computing the net self-force Fself acting on the system gives:

$$\vec{F}_{\mathrm{self}}=\vec{F}_{1\to2}+\vec{F}_{2\to1}
=-\frac{2q_1q_2\,\vec{a}}{4\pi\varepsilon_0 c^2 r}$$

The resulting force is proportional to $\vec{a}$ and increases the system's resistance to acceleration. It can therefore be considered (by definition) as increasing the mass of the system, with the mass increment Δm given (using Newton's second law) by:

$\Delta m=\frac{F_{\mathrm{self}}}{a}$

Calling this mass increment the "interaction electromagnetic mass" of the two charges, one obtains:

$$m_{\mathrm{elec}}
=
\frac{F_{\mathrm{self}}}{a}
=
\frac{2 q_1 q_2}{4\pi\varepsilon_0 c^2 r}$$

Note that if the charges q1 and q2 have the same sign, the electromagnetic mass is positive (referred to as a mass excess), whereas if the charges have opposite signs, the electromagnetic mass is negative (referred to as a mass defect).

Denoting by m1 the mass of charge q1, m2 the mass of charge q2, and M_{tot} the total mass of the system {q1+q2}, one finally has:

$$M_{tot}
=
m_{1}+m_{2}+\frac{2 q_1 q_2}{4\pi\varepsilon_0 c^2 r}$$

Conclusion: The laws of classical electromagnetism show that long-range interactions between charged particles can affect the overall mass of a system, which implies that the inertia of a body does not depend solely on the amount of matter it contains. The appearance of an interaction mass is caused by the finite speed at which fields propagate through space (c). Thus, a charged capacitor will be slightly more massive than the same uncharged capacitor, even though both consist of the exact same number of particles and no matter has been exchanged with the outside.

At the end of the 19th century, some physicists went so far as to claim that "mechanical" mass did not exist, and that 100% of the mass of bodies was of electromagnetic origin. However, such a hypothesis requires treating the electron and other elementary particles as spherical charge distributions, which cannot be assumed without detailed knowledge of the internal structure of these particles. Moreover, it is now known that other interactions in nature, such as gravitation and the strong nuclear interaction, can also affect the mass of bodies (nuclear mass defects are a clear illustration of this).

=== Transverse orientation ===
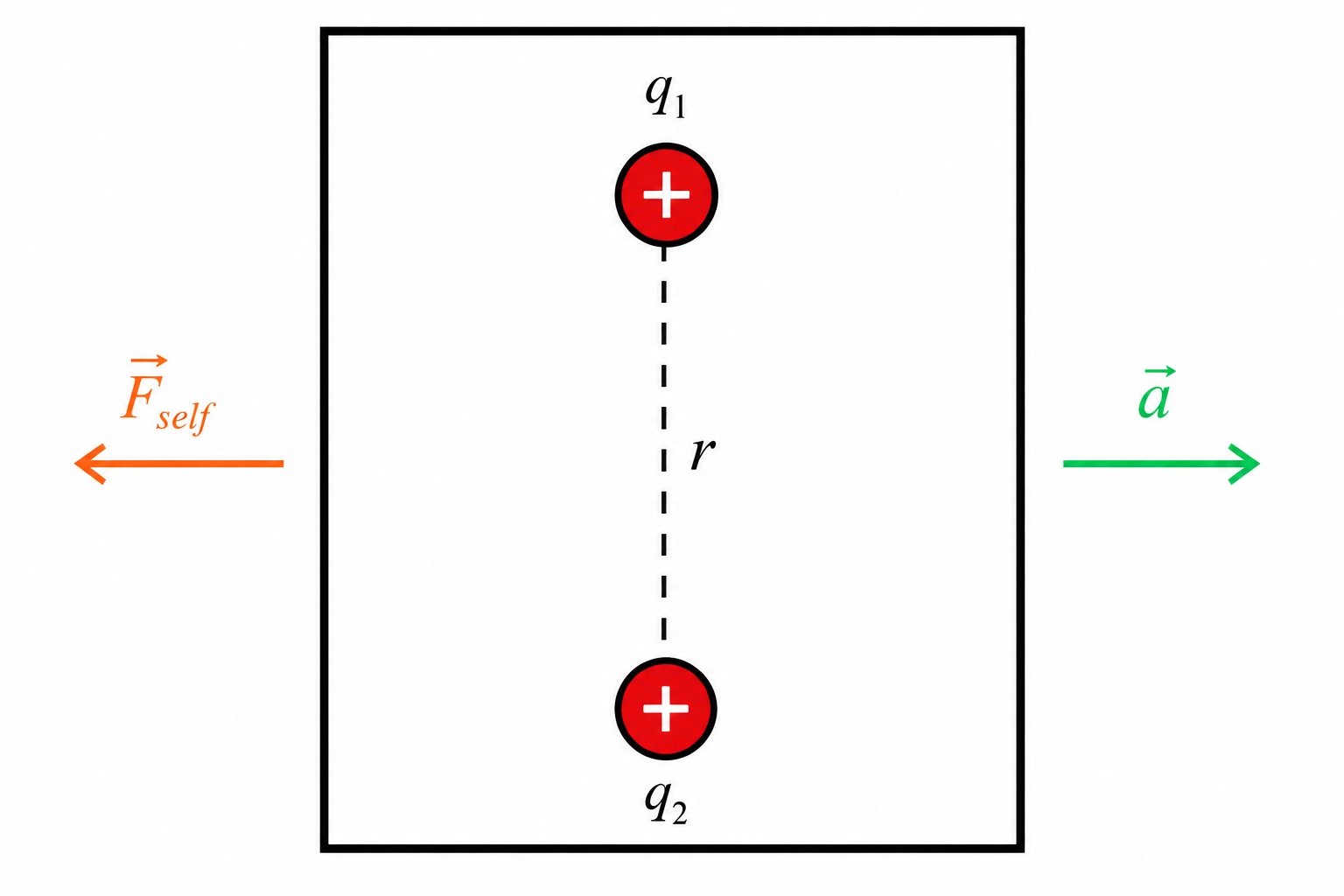
Self-interaction force of a system of two charges in a transverse configuration (θ = 90°)

Considering now the situation in which the acceleration $\vec{a}$ of the two-charge system is orthogonal to the charge axis (θ = 90°), the self-interaction force is:

$$F_{\mathrm{self}}=\frac{q_1 q_2 a}{4\pi\varepsilon_0 c^2 r}$$

which implies:

$$m_{\mathrm{elec}}
=
\frac{F_{\mathrm{self}}}{a}
=
\frac{q_1 q_2}{4\pi\varepsilon_0 c^2 r}$$

The interaction mass obtained is half that found in the longitudinal case.

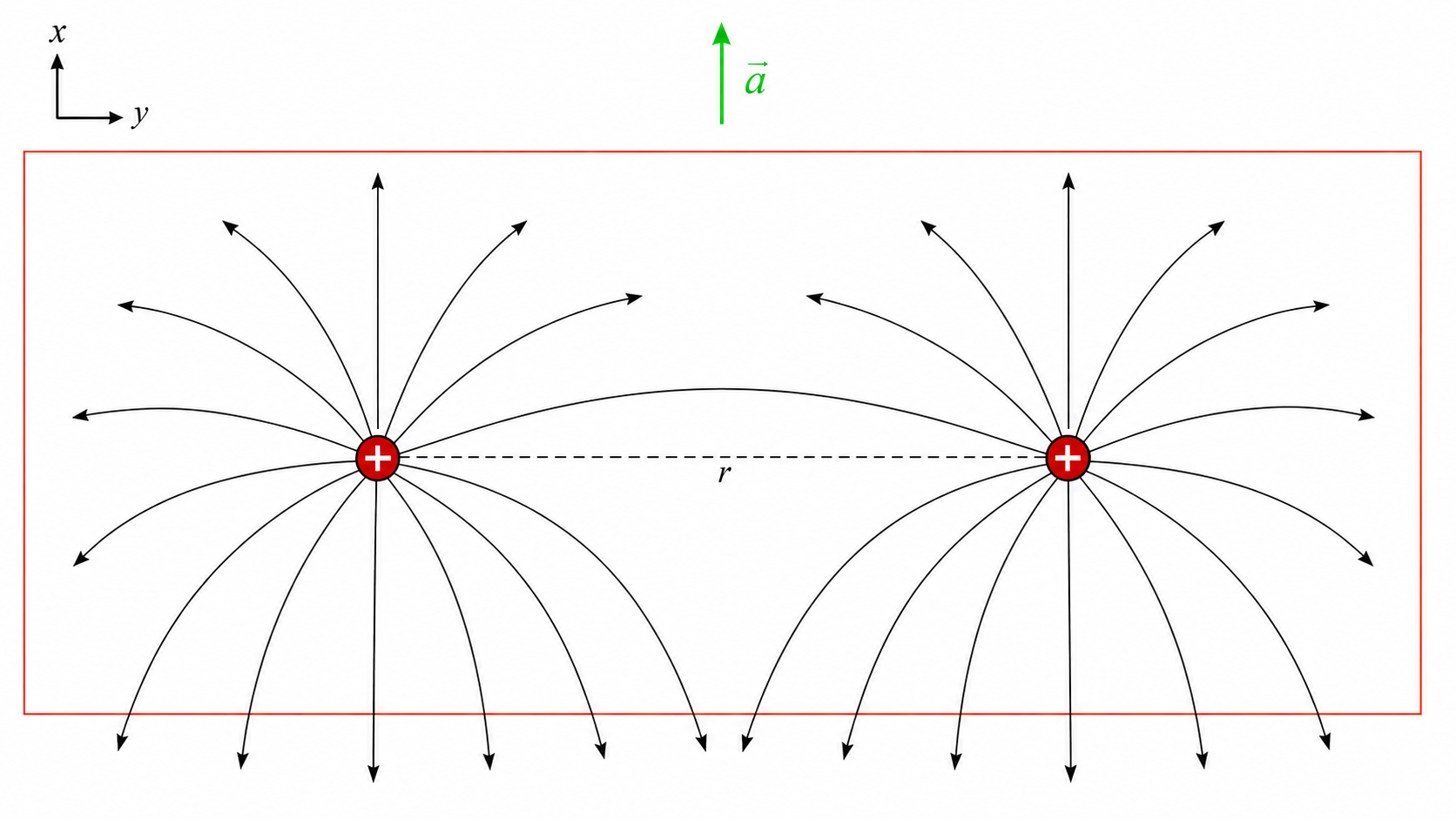
Curvature of electric field lines in the accelerated frame of two charges

To qualitatively understand the emergence of this self-interaction force in the transverse configuration, one can work in the accelerated frame of the two charges, where the electrostatic field lines appear curved, much like the trajectory of a tennis ball in a gravitational field. Each charge will then experience a slight electric force component opposing the acceleration, with E_{x} ~ E_{y}·(ar/c²) (following the equivalence principle of general relativity, electrostatic field lines are similarly curved for a charge at rest in a gravitational field). If the charges have opposite signs, the self-interaction force is directed along $\vec{a}$.

=== Arbitrary orientation ===
If the charge axis makes an arbitrary angle θ with the acceleration vector $\vec{a}$, the interaction electromagnetic mass of the two charges is:

$$m_{\mathrm{elec}}=\frac{q_1 q_2}{4\pi\varepsilon_0 c^2 r}\left(1+\cos^2\theta\right)$$

where the factor (1 + cos² θ) ranges between 1 and 2.

==== Appearance of a force orthogonal to the acceleration ====
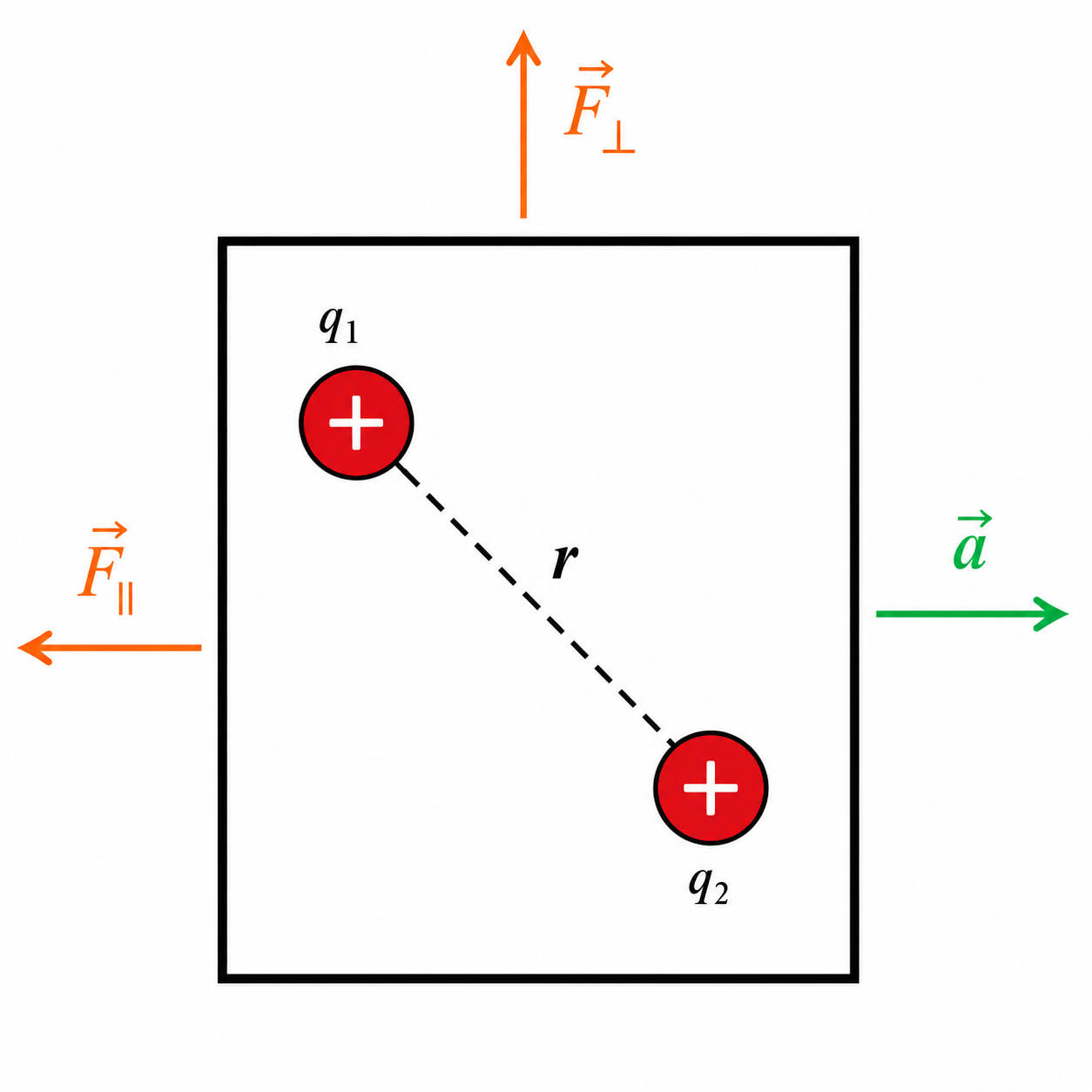
Self-interaction forces of a two-charge system under acceleration for an arbitrary angle θ

When θ is neither 0° nor 90°, a self-interaction force perpendicular to the acceleration ($F_{\perp}$) also appears, in addition to the component along the acceleration:

$$F_{\perp}=\frac{q_1 q_2 a}{4\pi\varepsilon_0 c^2 r}\cos(\theta)\sin(\theta)$$

However, only $F_{\parallel}$ can be considered as contributing to the inertia of the system. For reference:

$$F_{\parallel}=\frac{q_1 q_2 a}{4\pi\varepsilon_0 c^2 r}\left(1+\cos^2\theta\right)$$

$F_{\perp}$ is maximized when θ = 45°, as can be seen from the trigonometric identity:

$$\cos(\theta)\sin(\theta)=\frac{1}{2}\sin(2\theta)$$

since sin(2θ) is maximized at θ = 45°.

== Examples ==
=== Mass defect of the hydrogen atom ===
Hydrogen atom

A hydrogen atom consists of two particles with opposite electric charges (a proton and an electron) in interaction.

The respective masses of an isolated proton and electron are:

$$m_p = 1{.}672621924 \times 10^{-27}\,\mathrm{kg}$$

$$m_e = 9{.}109383702 \times 10^{-31}\,\mathrm{kg}$$

Their sum is:

$$m_p + m_e = 1{.}673532862 \times 10^{-27}\,\mathrm{kg}$$

The experimentally measured mass of a hydrogen atom is:

$$m_H = 1{.}673532838 \times 10^{-27}\,\mathrm{kg}$$

One finds:

$$m_H < m_p + m_e$$

The difference between the two masses (the mass defect) is:

$$\Delta m = 2{.}4 \times 10^{-35}\,\mathrm{kg}$$

This mass defect is precisely the (negative) interaction electromagnetic mass between the proton and the electron. It is approximately 100 million times smaller than the total mass of the hydrogen atom.

== Electromagnetic mass of a charged sphere ==
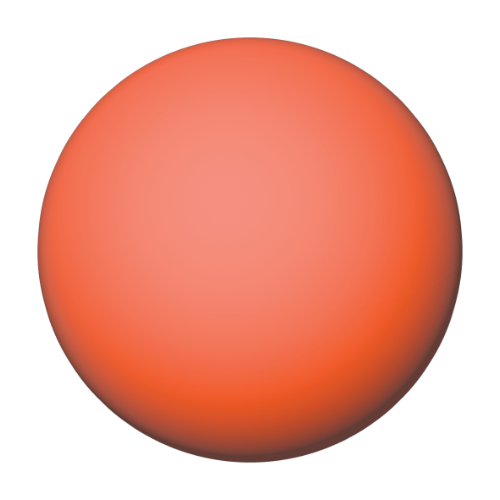
Charged sphere

Consider a sphere of radius R.

=== Uniformly volume-charged sphere ===
If the sphere carries a uniform volume charge density ρ throughout its volume, its electromagnetic mass can be calculated by integrating the mutual interaction forces between all infinitesimal charge pairs. The electromagnetic mass of such a charged sphere is:

$$M_{\mathrm{elec}}=\frac{16\pi\,\rho^2 R^5}{45\varepsilon_0}$$

This result can also be expressed in terms of the total charge Q carried by the sphere:

$$M_{\mathrm{elec}}=\frac{Q^2}{5\pi\varepsilon_0 R}$$

=== Uniformly surface-charged sphere ===
A spherical shell with a uniform surface charge density $\sigma$ has potential energy from the mutual repulsion in the shell. When this energy is converted to mass the result is:

$$M_\mathrm{elec}^\mathrm{energy} = \frac{Q^2}{8\pi\varepsilon_0 c^2 R}.$$
If the shell is set into motion, the momentum will imply a contribution to mass of
$$M_\mathrm{elec}^\mathrm{mom} = \frac{4}{3}\frac{Q^2}{8\pi\varepsilon_0 c^2 R}.$$
The extra 4/3 factor is attributed to Poincare stress: some force must exist to balance the mutual repulsion of the hypothetical shell and that force alters the mass.

== Relation to other physical quantities ==
=== Relation between electromagnetic mass and field momentum ===
Besides the relation m = F/a, other methods exist for computing the electromagnetic mass of a system: one of them consists of computing the momentum $\vec{p}$ of the electromagnetic field for an arbitrary velocity $\vec{v}$, then using m = p/v. The electromagnetic field momentum is given by:

$\vec{p}=\varepsilon_0\iiint (\vec{E}\times\vec{B})\,dV$

For two interacting bodies 1 and 2, one has:

$\vec{E}=\vec{E}_1+\vec{E}_2$ and $\vec{B}=\vec{B}_1+\vec{B}_2$

which gives:

$$\vec{p}=\varepsilon_0\iiint ((\vec{E}_1\times\vec{B}_1)+(\vec{E}_2\times\vec{B}_2)+(\vec{E}_1\times\vec{B}_2)+(\vec{E}_2\times\vec{B}_1))\,dV$$

Among the four terms, the first two correspond to the individual electromagnetic masses of bodies 1 and 2. To compute only the interaction electromagnetic mass between 1 and 2, only the last two terms need to be considered.

This method yields exactly the same results as the m = F/a method in all situations (both methods follow from Maxwell's equations and the Lorentz force).

=== Relation to magnetic energy ===
A third method consists of computing, for a given velocity $\vec{v}$, the energy U_{m} stored in the magnetic field of the system, then using m = 2U_{m} /v². Indeed, a moving charged body accumulates and stores energy (in magnetic form) in the same way that a moving massive body accumulates kinetic energy (mass is related to kinetic energy by the relation m = 2E_{c} /v²). The magnetic energy U_{m} accumulated by a moving charged body is, according to Poynting's theorem:

$U_m = \frac{1}{2\mu_0}\iiint B^2\, dV$

Since the magnetic field B generated by the body is, according to the Biot–Savart law, proportional to its velocity, the square of the magnetic field is therefore proportional to the square of the velocity, which allows a quantity homogeneous to a mass to emerge (m = 2U_{m}/v²). For two interacting bound bodies 1 and 2, one has:

$$\vec{B}=\vec{B}_1+\vec{B}_2$$

which implies:

$$B^2 = B_1^2 + B_2^2 + 2\,\vec{B}_1 \cdot \vec{B}_2$$

Among the three terms obtained, the first two correspond to the individual electromagnetic masses of bodies 1 and 2. If one wishes to compute only the interaction electromagnetic mass between 1 and 2, only the last term needs to be considered. In this case, one finds:

$$m_{\mathrm{elec}} = \frac{2}{\mu_0 v^2}\iiint \left(\vec{B}_1 \cdot \vec{B}_2\right)\, dV$$

=== Relation to electrostatic potential energy and E=mc² ===
The electrostatic interaction potential energy of two point charges q1 and q2 is given by:

$E_p=\frac{q_1 q_2}{4\pi\varepsilon_0 r}$

From the earlier results for the interaction electromagnetic mass, it follows that for a system of two charges aligned along an axis parallel to the acceleration vector $\vec{a}$ (θ = 0°):

$$m_{\mathrm{elec}}=\frac{2 E_{\mathrm{p}}}{c^2}$$

If the charge axis is orthogonal to the acceleration vector $\vec{a}$ (θ = 90°):

$$m_{\mathrm{elec}}=\frac{E_{\mathrm{p}}}{c^2}$$

The transverse case is therefore consistent with Albert Einstein's general relation between mass and energy (E=mc²), while the longitudinal case differs from this formula by a factor of 2. It therefore appears that the relation m = E/c² yields results for the electromagnetic mass that sometimes diverge from those of the three other calculation methods (m = F/a, m = p/v and m = 2U_{m} /v²).

==== The 4/3 problem ====
For a spherical charge distribution (whether the charge is distributed on the surface of the sphere or throughout its volume), one always finds:

$$M_{\mathrm{elec}}=\frac{4}{3}\frac{E_p}{c^2}$$

This discrepancy between the results of the two approaches (E=mc² and electromagnetic theory) has generated much debate since the early 20th century. This is known as the 4/3 problem.

===== Poincaré stresses =====
Abraham (1904, 1905) argued that non-electromagnetic forces were necessary to prevent Lorentz's contractile electrons from exploding. He also showed that different results for the longitudinal electromagnetic mass can be obtained in Lorentz's theory, depending on whether the mass is calculated from its energy or its momentum, so a non-electromagnetic potential (corresponding to 1/3 of the electron's electromagnetic energy) was necessary to render these masses equal. Abraham doubted whether it was possible to develop a model satisfying all of these properties.

To solve those problems, Henri Poincaré in 1905 and 1906 introduced some sort of pressure ("Poincaré stresses") of non-electromagnetic nature. As required by Abraham, these stresses contribute non-electromagnetic energy to the electrons, amounting to 1/4 of their total energy or to 1/3 of their electromagnetic energy. So, the Poincaré stresses remove the contradiction in the derivation of the longitudinal electromagnetic mass, they prevent the electron from exploding, they remain unaltered by a Lorentz transformation (i.e. they are Lorentz invariant), and were also thought as a dynamical explanation of length contraction. However, Poincaré still assumed that only the electromagnetic energy contributes to the mass of the bodies.

As it was later noted, the problem lies in the 4/3 factor of electromagnetic rest mass – given above as $m_\mathrm{em}=\tfrac{4}{3} E_\mathrm{em}/c^2$ when derived from the Abraham–Lorentz equations. However, when it is derived from the electron's electrostatic energy alone, we have $m_\mathrm{es}=E_\mathrm{em}/c^2$ where the 4/3 factor is missing. This can be solved by adding the non-electromagnetic energy $E_\mathrm{p}$ of the Poincaré stresses to $E_\mathrm{em}$, the electron's total energy $E_\mathrm{tot}$ now becomes:

$$\frac{E_\mathrm{tot}}{c^{2}}=\frac{E_\mathrm{em}+E_\mathrm{p}}{c^{2}}=\frac{E_\mathrm{em}+\frac{E_\mathrm{em}}{3}}{c^{2}}=\frac{4}{3}\frac{E_\mathrm{em}}{c^{2}}=\frac{4}{3}m_\mathrm{es}=m_\mathrm{em}$$

Thus the missing 4/3 factor is restored when the mass is related to its electromagnetic energy, and it disappears when the total energy is considered.

==== Nuclear fission ====
Animated diagram of nuclear fission. An atom is struck by a neutron. The atom splits into two smaller atoms (fission fragments, or fission products), which repel each other due to the electrostatic force.

In nuclear fission, a heavy atomic nucleus is split into lighter nuclides. The electrostatic force between the (positively charged) nuclear fragments causes an intense repulsion that releases a large amount of energy. There is then a conversion of electrostatic potential energy into kinetic energy and radiation (in the case of nuclear fusion, it is potential energy associated with the strong force that is released).

The total mass of the reaction products is then lower than the initial total mass. This difference corresponds to the decrease in the electromagnetic mass of the system due to the separation of the charged particles (the protons), which were originally confined within the same nucleus. The same phenomenon of electromagnetic mass loss occurs when energy is released in chemical reactions, but on a far smaller scale.

== Origin of electromagnetic induction ==
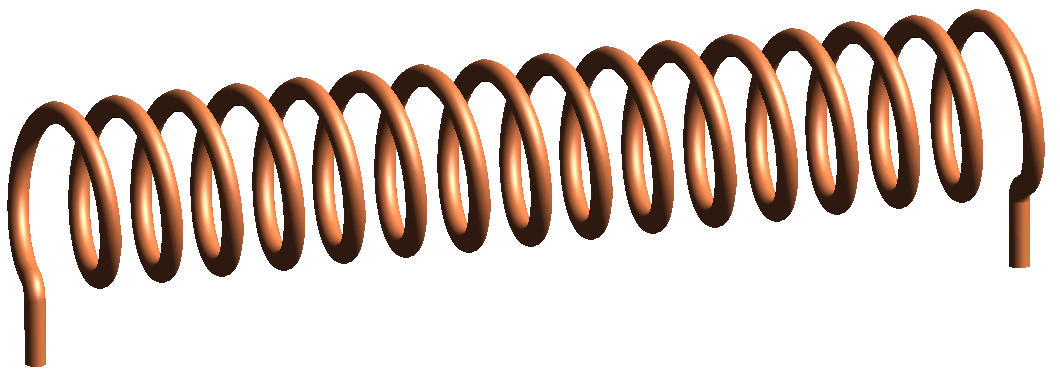
Inductor of inductance L

Returning to the expression (to order 1/c²) of the electric field created by a point charge q in the quasi-static approximation:

$$\mathbf{E}
=
\frac{q}{4\pi \varepsilon_0}
\left(
\frac{\mathbf{n}}{r^2}
-
\frac{\mathbf{a} + (\mathbf{a}\cdot \mathbf{n})\,\mathbf{n}}{2c^2 r}
\right)$$

one can readily identify the term responsible for the electromagnetic mass (term 2). This term, in addition to giving rise to electromagnetic mass, is also the origin of the phenomenon of electromagnetic induction. Indeed, it also explains why a voltage can appear in an electrical circuit when the current varies. This is related to the fact that the acceleration of charges causes retardation effects in the propagation of the electric field, which manifest as this induction term (note also that, unlike the Coulomb term, this term is not conservative). If the electric field propagated instantaneously $(c \rightarrow \infty)$, electromagnetic induction would not exist, nor would electromagnetic mass.

This explains why an inductor exhibits a form of electromagnetic inertia, opposing changes in electric current. In doing so, an inductance L stores energy in the same way that a mass M stores kinetic energy:

$E_c = \frac{1}{2}Mv^2$ ; $E_L = \frac{1}{2}Li^2$

For reference, an inductor is described by the relation:

$$u_L = L\frac{di}{dt}$$

In 1912, Albert Einstein published an article entitled "Is There an Analogy Between the Gravitational Effect and the Electrodynamic Induction Effect?", extending these ideas to the gravitational interaction.

== Rest mass and energy ==
It was recognized by J. J. Thomson in 1881 that a charged sphere moving in a space filled with a medium of a specific inductive capacity (the electromagnetic aether of James Clerk Maxwell), is harder to set in motion than an uncharged body. (Similar considerations were already made by George Gabriel Stokes (1843) with respect to hydrodynamics, who showed that the inertia of a body moving in an incompressible perfect fluid is increased.) So due to this self-induction effect, electrostatic energy behaves as having some sort of momentum and "apparent" electromagnetic mass, which can increase the ordinary mechanical mass of the bodies, or in more modern terms, the increase should arise from their electromagnetic self-energy. This idea was worked out in more detail by Oliver Heaviside (1889), Thomson (1893), George Frederick Charles Searle (1897), and W. B. Morton. In 1899, and more completely in 1904 Hendrik Lorentz approached the problem differently, proposing a general transformation dependent upon velocity, the Lorentz contraction. Max Abraham, in 1902, showed that the electron's transverse differs from its longitudinal momentum calculated in the preceding theories.

The electrostatic energy $E_\mathrm{em}$ and mass $m_\mathrm{em}$ of an electron at rest was calculated to be

$$E_\mathrm{em}=\frac{1}{2}\frac{e^{2}}{a},\qquad m_\mathrm{em}=\frac{2}{3}\frac{e^{2}}{ac^{2}}$$

where $e$ is the charge, uniformly distributed on the surface of a sphere, and $a$ is the classical electron radius, which must be nonzero to avoid infinite energy accumulation. Thus the formula for this electromagnetic energy–mass relation is

$$m_\mathrm{em}=\frac{4}{3}\frac{E_\mathrm{em}}{c^{2}}$$

This was discussed in connection with the proposal of the electrical origin of matter, so Wilhelm Wien (1900), and Max Abraham (1902), came to the conclusion that the total mass of the bodies is identical to its electromagnetic mass. Wien stated, that if it is assumed that gravitation is an electromagnetic effect too, then there has to be a proportionality between electromagnetic energy, inertial mass, and gravitational mass. When one body attracts another one, the electromagnetic energy store of gravitation is according to Wien diminished by the amount (where $M$ is the attracted mass, $G$ the gravitational constant, $r$ the distance):

$$G\frac{\frac{4}{3}\frac{E_\mathrm{em}}{c^{2}}M}{r}$$

Henri Poincaré in 1906 argued that when mass is in fact the product of the electromagnetic field in the aether – implying that no "real" mass exists – and because matter is inseparably connected with mass, then also matter doesn't exist at all and electrons are only concavities in the aether.

== Mass and speed ==
=== Thomson and Searle ===
Thomson (1893) noticed that electromagnetic momentum and energy of charged bodies, and therefore their masses, depend on the speed of the bodies as well. He wrote:

[p. 21] When in the limit v = c, the increase in mass is infinite, thus a charged sphere moving with the velocity of light behaves as if its mass were infinite, its velocity therefore will remain constant, in other words it is impossible to increase the velocity of a charged body moving through the dielectric beyond that of light.

In 1897, Searle gave a more precise formula for the electromagnetic energy of charged sphere in motion:

$$E_\mathrm{em}^{v}=E_\mathrm{em}\left[\frac{1}{\beta}\ln\frac{1+\beta}{1-\beta}-1\right],\qquad\beta=\frac{v}{c},$$

and like Thomson he concluded:

... when v = c the energy becomes infinite, so that it would seem to be impossible to make a charged body move at a greater speed than that of light.

=== Longitudinal and transverse mass ===
Predictions of speed dependence of transverse electromagnetic mass according to the theories of Abraham, Lorentz, and Bucherer.

From Searle's formula, Walter Kaufmann (1901) and Max Abraham (1902) derived the formula for the electromagnetic mass of moving bodies:

$$m_{L}=\frac{3}{4}\cdot m_\mathrm{em}\cdot\frac{1}{\beta^{2}}\left[-\frac{1}{\beta}\ln\left(\frac{1+\beta}{1-\beta}\right)+\frac{2}{1-\beta^{2}}\right]$$

However, it was shown by Abraham (1902), that this value is only valid in the longitudinal direction ("longitudinal mass"), i.e., that the electromagnetic mass also depends on the direction of the moving bodies with respect to the aether. Thus Abraham also derived the "transverse mass":

$$m_{T}=\frac{3}{4}\cdot m_\mathrm{em}\cdot\frac{1}{\beta^{2}}\left[\left(\frac{1+\beta^{2}}{2\beta}\right)\ln\left(\frac{1+\beta}{1-\beta}\right)-1\right]$$

On the other hand, already in 1899 Lorentz assumed that the electrons undergo length contraction in the line of motion, which leads to results for the acceleration of moving electrons that differ from those given by Abraham. Lorentz obtained factors of $k^3 \varepsilon$ parallel to the direction of motion and $k\varepsilon$ perpendicular to the direction of motion, where $k = \sqrt{1- v^2 / c^2}$ and $\varepsilon$ is an undetermined factor. Lorentz expanded his 1899 ideas in his famous 1904 paper, where he set the factor $\varepsilon$ to unity, thus:

$$m_{L}=\frac{m_\mathrm{em}}{\left(\sqrt{1-\frac{v^{2}}{c^{2}}}\right)^{3}},\quad m_{T}=\frac{m_\mathrm{em}}{\sqrt{1-\frac{v^{2}}{c^{2}}}}$$,

So, eventually Lorentz arrived at the same conclusion as Thomson in 1893: no body can reach the speed of light because the mass becomes infinitely large at this velocity.

Additionally, a third electron model was developed by Alfred Bucherer and Paul Langevin, in which the electron contracts in the line of motion, and expands perpendicular to it, so that the volume remains constant. This gives:

$$m_{L}=\frac{m_\mathrm{em}\left(1-\frac{1}{3}\frac{v^{2}}{c^{2}}\right)}{\left(\sqrt{1-\frac{v^{2}}{c^{2}}}\right)^{8/3}},\quad m_{T}=\frac{m_\mathrm{em}}{\left(\sqrt{1-\frac{v^{2}}{c^{2}}}\right)^{2/3}}$$

=== Kaufmann's experiments ===
The predictions of the theories of Abraham and Lorentz were supported by the experiments of Walter Kaufmann (1901), but the experiments were not precise enough to distinguish between them. In 1905 Kaufmann conducted another series of experiments (Kaufmann–Bucherer–Neumann experiments) which confirmed Abraham's and Bucherer's predictions, but contradicted Lorentz's theory and the "fundamental assumption of Lorentz and Einstein", i.e., the relativity principle. In the following years experiments by Alfred Bucherer (1908), Gunther Neumann (1914) and others seemed to confirm Lorentz's mass formula. It was later pointed out that the Bucherer–Neumann experiments were also not precise enough to distinguish between the theories – it lasted until 1940 when the precision required was achieved to eventually prove Lorentz's formula and to refute Abraham's by these kinds of experiments. (However, other experiments of different kind already refuted Abraham's and Bucherer's formulas long before.)

== Inertia of energy and radiation paradoxes ==
=== Radiation pressure ===
Another way of deriving some sort of electromagnetic mass was based on the concept of radiation pressure. These pressures or tensions in the electromagnetic field were derived by James Clerk Maxwell (1874) and Adolfo Bartoli (1876). Lorentz recognized in 1895 that those tensions also arise in his theory of the stationary aether. So if the electromagnetic field of the aether is able to set bodies in motion, the action / reaction principle demands that the aether must be set in motion by matter as well. However, Lorentz pointed out that any tension in the aether requires the mobility of the aether parts, which is not possible since in his theory the aether is immobile. (unlike contemporaries like Thomson who used fluid descriptions) This represents a violation of the reaction principle that was accepted by Lorentz consciously. He continued by saying, that one can only speak about fictitious tensions, since they are only mathematical models in his theory to ease the description of the electrodynamic interactions.

=== Mass of the fictitious electromagnetic fluid ===
In 1900 Poincaré studied the conflict between the action/reaction principle and Lorentz's theory. He tried to determine whether the center of gravity still moves with a uniform velocity when electromagnetic fields and radiation are involved. He noticed that the action/reaction principle does not hold for matter alone, but that the electromagnetic field has its own momentum (such a momentum was also derived by Thomson in 1893 in a more complicated way). Poincaré concluded, the electromagnetic field energy behaves like a fictitious fluid ("fluide fictif") with a mass density of $E_\mathrm{em}/c^2$ (in other words $m_\mathrm{em}=E_\mathrm{em}/c^2$). Now, if the center of mass frame (COM-frame) is defined by both the mass of matter and the mass of the fictitious fluid, and if the fictitious fluid is indestructible – it is neither created or destroyed – then the motion of the center of mass frame remains uniform.

But this electromagnetic fluid is not indestructible, because it can be absorbed by matter (which according to Poincaré was the reason why he regarded the em-fluid as "fictitious" rather than "real"). Thus the COM-principle would be violated again. As it was later done by Einstein, an easy solution of this would be to assume that the mass of em-field is transferred to matter in the absorption process. But Poincaré created another solution: He assumed that there exists an immobile non-electromagnetic energy fluid at each point in space, also carrying a mass proportional to its energy. When the fictitious em-fluid is destroyed or absorbed, its electromagnetic energy and mass is not carried away by moving matter, but is transferred into the non-electromagnetic fluid and remains at exactly the same place in that fluid. (Poincaré added that one should not be too surprised by these assumptions, since they are only mathematical fictions.) In this way, the motion of the COM-frame, including matter, fictitious em-fluid, and fictitious non-em-fluid, at least theoretically remains uniform.

However, since only matter and electromagnetic energy are directly observable by experiment (not the non-em-fluid), Poincaré's resolution still violates the reaction principle and the COM-theorem, when an emission/absorption process is practically considered. This leads to a paradox when changing frames: if waves are radiated in a certain direction, the device will suffer a recoil from the momentum of the fictitious fluid. Then, Poincaré performed a Lorentz boost (to first order in v/c) to the frame of the moving source. He noted that energy conservation holds in both frames, but that the law of conservation of momentum is violated. This would allow perpetual motion, a notion which he abhorred. The laws of nature would have to be different in the frames of reference, and the relativity principle would not hold. Therefore, he argued that also in this case there has to be another compensating mechanism in the ether.

Poincaré came back to this topic in 1904. This time he rejected his own solution that motions in the ether can compensate the motion of matter, because any such motion is unobservable and therefore scientifically worthless. He also abandoned the concept that energy carries mass and wrote in connection to the above-mentioned recoil:

The apparatus will recoil as if it were a cannon and the projected energy a ball, and that contradicts the principle of Newton, since our present projectile has no mass; it is not matter, it is energy.

These iterative developments culminated in his 1906 publication "The End of Matter" in which he notes that when applying the methodology of using an electric or magnetic field deviations to determine charge-to-mass ratios, one finds that the apparent mass added by charge makes up all of the apparent mass, thus the "real mass is equal to zero." Thus he goes on to postulate that electrons are only holes or motion effects in the aether while the aether itself is the only thing "endowed with inertia."

He then goes on to address the possibility that all matter might share this same quality and thereby his position changes from viewing aether as a "fictitious fluid" to suggesting it might be the only thing that actually exists in the universe, finally stating "In this system there is no actual matter, there are only holes in the aether."

Finally he repeats this exact problem of "Newton's principle" from 1904 again in 1908 publication in his section on "the principle of reaction" he notes that the actions of radiation pressure cannot be tied solely to matter in light of Fizeau's proof that the Hertz notion of total ether drag is untenable. This, he clarifies in the next section in his own explanation of Mass–energy equivalence:

Well, the deformation of the electrons, a deformation which depends upon their velocity, will modify the distribution of the electricity upon their surface, consequently the intensity of the convection current they produce, consequently the laws according to which the self-induction of this current will vary as a function of the velocity.

At this price, the compensation will be perfect and will conform to the requirements of the principle of relativity, but only upon two conditions :

1° That the positive electrons have no real mass, but only a fictitious electromagnetic mass; or at least that their real mass, if it exists, is not constant and varies with the velocity according to the same laws as their fictitious mass;

2° That all forces are of electromagnetic origin, or at least that they vary with the velocity according to the same laws as the forces of electromagnetic origin.

It still is Lorentz who has made this remarkable synthesis; stop a moment and see what follows therefrom. First, there is no more matter, since the positive electrons no longer have real mass, or at least no constant real mass. The present principles of our mechanics, founded upon the constancy of mass, must therefore be modified. Again, an electromagnetic explanation must be sought of all the known forces, in particular of gravitation, or at least the law of gravitation must be so modified that this force is altered by velocity in the same way as the electromagnetic forces.

Thus Poincaré's mass of a fictitious fluid led him to, instead, later find that the mass of matter itself was "fictitious."

Einstein's own 1906 publication grants credit to Poincare for previously exploring the mass-energy equivalence and it is from these comments that it is commonly reported that Lorentz ether theory is "mathematically equivalent."

=== Momentum and cavity radiation ===
However, Poincaré's idea of momentum and mass associated with radiation proved to be fruitful, when in 1903 Max Abraham introduced the term "electromagnetic momentum", having a field density of $E_{em}/c^2$ per cm^{3} and $E_{em}/c$ per cm^{2}. Contrary to Lorentz and Poincaré, who considered momentum as a fictitious force, he argued that it is a real physical entity, and therefore conservation of momentum is guaranteed.

In 1904, Friedrich Hasenöhrl specifically associated inertia with radiation by studying the dynamics of a moving cavity. Hasenöhrl suggested that part of the mass of a body (which he called "apparent mass") can be thought of as radiation bouncing around a cavity. The apparent mass of radiation depends on the temperature (because every heated body emits radiation) and is proportional to its energy, and he first concluded that $m=\tfrac{8}{3}E/c^2$. However, in 1905 Hasenöhrl published a summary of a letter, which was written by Abraham to him. Abraham concluded that Hasenöhrl's formula of the apparent mass of radiation is not correct, and on the basis of his definition of electromagnetic momentum and longitudinal electromagnetic mass Abraham changed it to $m=\tfrac{4}{3}E/c^2$, the same value for the electromagnetic mass for a body at rest. Hasenöhrl recalculated his own derivation and verified Abraham's result. He also noticed the similarity between the apparent mass and the electromagnetic mass that Poincaré would comment on in 1906. However, Hasenöhrl stated that this energy-apparent-mass relation only holds as long a body radiates, i.e. if the temperature of a body is greater than 0 K.

== Modern view ==
=== Mass–energy equivalence ===
The idea that the principal relations between mass, energy, momentum and velocity can only be considered on the basis of dynamical interactions of matter was superseded, when Albert Einstein found out in 1905 that considerations based on the special principle of relativity require that all forms of energy (not only electromagnetic) contribute to the mass of bodies (mass–energy equivalence). That is, the entire mass of a body is a measure of its energy content by $E=mc^2$, and Einstein's considerations were independent from assumptions about the constitution of matter. By this equivalence, Poincaré's radiation paradox can be solved without using "compensating forces", because the mass of matter itself (not the non-electromagnetic aether fluid as suggested by Poincaré) is increased or diminished by the mass of electromagnetic energy in the course of the emission/absorption process. Also the idea of an electromagnetic explanation of gravitation was superseded in the course of developing general relativity.

So every theory dealing with the mass of a body must be formulated in a relativistic way from the outset. This is for example the case in the current quantum field explanation of mass of elementary particles in the framework of the Standard Model, the Higgs mechanism. Because of this, the idea that any form of mass is completely caused by interactions with electromagnetic fields, is not relevant any more.

=== Relativistic mass ===
The concepts of longitudinal and transverse mass (equivalent to those of Lorentz) were also used by Einstein in his first papers on relativity. However, in special relativity they apply to the entire mass of matter, not only to the electromagnetic part. Later it was shown by physicists like Richard Chace Tolman that expressing mass as the ratio of force and acceleration is not advantageous. Therefore, a similar concept without direction dependent terms, in which force is defined as $\vec{F} = \mathrm{d}\vec{p}/\mathrm{d}t$, was used as relativistic mass

$$M=\frac{m_{0}}{\sqrt{1-\frac{v^{2}}{c^{2}}}},\qquad m_{0}=\frac{E}{c^2},$$

This concept is sometimes still used in modern physics textbooks, although the term 'mass' is now considered by many to refer to invariant mass, see mass in special relativity.

=== Self-energy ===
When the special case of the electromagnetic self-energy or self-force of charged particles is discussed, also in modern texts some sort of "effective" electromagnetic mass is sometimes introduced – not as an explanation of mass per se, but in addition to the ordinary mass of bodies. Many different reformulations of the Abraham–Lorentz force have been derived – for instance, in order to deal with the 4/3-problem (see next section) and other problems that arose from this concept. Such questions are discussed in connection with renormalization, and on the basis of quantum mechanics and quantum field theory, which must be applied when the electron is considered physically point-like. At distances located in the classical domain, the classical concepts again come into play. A rigorous derivation of the electromagnetic self-force, including the contribution to the mass of the body, was published by Gralla et al. (2009).

=== 4/3 problem ===
Max von Laue in 1911 also used the Abraham–Lorentz equations of motion in his development of special relativistic dynamics, so that also in special relativity the 4/3 factor is present when the electromagnetic mass of a charged sphere is calculated. This contradicts the mass–energy equivalence formula, which requires the relation $m_\mathrm{em}=E_\mathrm{em}/c^2$ without the 4/3 factor, or in other words, four-momentum doesn't properly transform like a four-vector when the 4/3 factor is present. Laue found a solution equivalent to Poincaré's introduction of a non-electromagnetic potential (Poincaré stresses), but Laue showed its deeper, relativistic meaning by employing and advancing Hermann Minkowski's spacetime formalism. Laue's formalism required that there are additional components and forces, which guarantee that spatially extended systems (where both electromagnetic and non-electromagnetic energies are combined) are forming a stable or "closed system" and transform as a four-vector. That is, the 4/3 factor arises only with respect to electromagnetic mass, while the closed system has total rest mass and energy of $m_\mathrm{tot}=E_\mathrm{tot}/c^2$.

Another solution was found by authors such as Enrico Fermi (1922), Paul Dirac (1938) Fritz Rohrlich (1960), or Julian Schwinger (1983), who pointed out that the electron's stability and the 4/3-problem are two different things. They showed that the preceding definitions of four-momentum are non-relativistic per se, and by changing the definition into a relativistic form, the electromagnetic mass can simply be written as $m_\mathrm{em}=E_\mathrm{em}/c^2$ and thus the 4/3 factor doesn't appear at all. So every part of the system, not only "closed" systems, properly transforms as a four-vector. However, binding forces like the Poincaré stresses are still necessary to prevent the electron from exploding due to Coulomb repulsion. But on the basis of the Fermi–Rohrlich definition, this is only a dynamical problem and has nothing to do with the transformation properties any more.

Also other solutions have been proposed, for instance, Valery Morozov (2011) gave consideration to movement of an imponderable charged sphere. It turned out that a flux of nonelectromagnetic energy exists in the sphere body. This flux has an impulse exactly equal to 1/3 of the sphere electromagnetic impulse regardless of a sphere internal structure or a material, it is made of. The problem was solved without attraction of any additional hypotheses. In this model, sphere tensions are not connected with its mass.

Fedosin (2024) presented formulas for calculating four-momentum in curved space-time. The use of these formulas for a relativistic uniform system shows that volume integral of time components of stress-energy tensor of the system, taking into account fields, gives an integral vector that is not a four-vector. The stress-energy tensor of electromagnetic field is part of the stress-energy tensor of the system, therefore, the integration of time components of the stress-energy tensor of electromagnetic field gives not a four-momentum of field, but an integral vector of electromagnetic field. From the components of this integral vector, it is possible to extract the corresponding masses-energies of electromagnetic field, the ratio of which is 4/3. Thus, the appearance of the 4/3 problem is due to the fact that instead of using the covariant formula for the four-momentum of electromagnetic field, the integration of time components of stress-energy tensor of electromagnetic field is used, which does not give the four-momentum of electromagnetic field.

== See also ==
- Electric field
- Coulomb's law
- Maxwell's equations
- Panofsky–Phillips equations
- Quasi-static approximation
- Mass / Inertia
- E=mc²
- Inductance
- Abraham–Lorentz force
