= Karl Glitscher =

German physicist

Karl Glitscher (1886 – 1945) was a German physicist who made contributions to quantum mechanics.

== Education ==
Glitscher studied under Arnold Sommerfeld at the Ludwig-Maximilians-Universität München. For his doctoral dissertation, Sommerfeld asked Glitscher to compare the relativistic theory of the electron with Max Abraham's theory of the rigid electron relative to the fine structure of spectral lines. Following a suggestion by Wilhelm Lenz, a former student of Sommerfeld who received his doctorate in 1911, Glitscher was able to calculate the fine structure spectra, and he found that the rigid electron was ruled out by Friedrich Paschen's data on one-electron atoms and the X-ray spectral doublets. Glitscher's theoretical calculations served as his doctoral thesis, and he was awarded his doctorate in 1917.

== Career ==
Glitscher filed a patent in Germany in 1930 and in the United States in 1931 for an artificial horizon indicator for vehicles or similar platforms. The patent was assigned to Gesellschaft für elektrische Apparate mbH, in Marienfelde-Berlin. The Gesellschaft für elektrische Apparate (Gelap) was founded in 1920 to refine technical military equipment. Gelap evolved from the signals department of Siemens & Halske and produced communication and command systems for military organizations and commercial shipping.

== Selected Literature ==
- Karl Glitscher Spektroskopischer Vergleich zwischen den Theorien des starren und des deformierbaren Elektrons, Annalen der Physik 52 608–630 (1917) (abridged doctoral dissertation, Ludwig-Maximilians-Universität München; received 14 May 1917, published in issue No.6 of 17 July 1917) as cited in Mehra, Volume 1, Part 2, 2001, p. 778.

== Patents ==
- K. Glitscher US Patent 1,932,210, Indicator Berlin-Dauern, Germany, assigned to Gesellschaft für elektrische Apparate mbH, Marienfelde-Berlin, Germany. U.S. Application filed 19 September 1931, Serial Number 563,799, and in Germany 12 August 1930. (Google Patents, via scholar.google.com.)
