= Transverse mass =

Quantity in particle physics

The transverse mass is a useful quantity to define for use in particle physics as it is invariant under Lorentz boost along the z direction. In natural units, it is:
$$m_T^2 = m^2 + p_x^2 + p_y^2 = E^2 - p_z^2$$

- where the z-direction is along the beam pipe and so
- $p_x$ and $p_y$ are the momentum perpendicular to the beam pipe and
- $m$ is the (invariant) mass.

This definition of the transverse mass is used in conjunction with the definition of the (directed) transverse energy
$$\vec{E}_T = E \frac{\vec{p}_T}{|\vec{p}|} = \frac{E}{\sqrt{E^2-m^2}}\vec{p}_T$$
with the transverse momentum vector $\vec{p}_T = (p_x, p_y)$. It is easy to see that for vanishing mass ($m = 0$) the three quantities are the same: $E_T = p_T = m_T$. The transverse mass is used together with the rapidity, transverse momentum and polar angle in the parameterization of the four-momentum of a single particle:
$$(E, p_x, p_y, p_z) = (m_T \cosh y,\ p_T \cos\phi,\ p_T \sin\phi,\ m_T \sinh y)$$

Using these definitions (in particular for $E_{T}$) gives for the mass of a two particle system:

$$M_{ab}^2 = (p_a + p_b)^2 = p_a^2 + p_b^2 + 2 p_a p_b = m_a^2 + m_b^2 + 2 (E_a E_b - \vec{p}_a\cdot \vec{p}_b)$$
$$M_{ab}^2 = m_a^2 + m_b^2 + 2 \left(E_{T,a}\frac{\sqrt{p_{a,x}^2+p_{a,y}^2+p_{a,z}^2}}{p_{T,a}} E_{T,b}\frac{\sqrt{p_{b,x}^2+p_{b,y}^2+p_{b,z}^2}}{p_{T,b}} - \vec{p}_{T,a}\cdot \vec{p}_{T,b} - p_{z,a}p_{z,b}\right)$$
$$M_{ab}^2 = m_a^2 + m_b^2 + 2 \left(E_{T,a}E_{T,b}\sqrt{1+p_{a,z}^2/p_{T,a}^2}\sqrt{1+p_{b,z}^2/p_{T,b}^2} - \vec{p}_{T,a}\cdot \vec{p}_{T,b} - p_{z,a}p_{z,b}\right)$$

Looking at the transverse projection of this system (by setting $p_{a,z} = p_{b,z} = 0$) gives:

$$(M_{ab}^2)_T = m_a^2 + m_b^2 + 2 \left(E_{T,a}E_{T,b} - \vec{p}_{T,a}\cdot \vec{p}_{T,b}\right)$$

These are also the definitions that are used by the software package ROOT, which is commonly used in high energy physics.

== Transverse mass in two-particle systems ==
Hadron collider physicists use another definition of transverse mass (and transverse energy), in the case of a decay into two particles. This is often used when one particle cannot be detected directly but is only indicated by missing transverse energy. In that case, the total energy is unknown and the above definition cannot be used.

$$M_{T}^2 = (E_{T, 1} + E_{T, 2})^2 - (\vec{p}_{T, 1} + \vec{p}_{T, 2})^2$$

where $E_{T}$ is the transverse energy of each daughter, a positive quantity defined using its true invariant mass $m$ as:

$$E_{T}^2 = m^2 + (\vec{p}_{T})^2$$,

which is coincidentally the definition of the transverse mass for a single particle given above. Using these two definitions, one also gets the form:

$$M_{T}^2 = m_1^2 + m_2^2 + 2 \left(E_{T, 1}  E_{T, 2}  - \vec{p}_{T, 1} \cdot \vec{p}_{T, 2} \right)$$

(but with slightly different definitions for $E_T$!)

For massless daughters, where $m_1 = m_2 = 0$, we again have $E_{T} = p_T$, and the transverse mass of the two particle system becomes:

$$M_{T}^2 \rightarrow 2 E_{T, 1}  E_{T, 2} \left( 1 - \cos \phi \right)$$

where $\phi$ is the angle between the daughters in the transverse plane. The distribution of $M_T$ has an end-point at the invariant mass $M$ of the system with $M_T \leq M$. This has been used to determine the $W$ mass at the Tevatron.
