= History of special relativity =

The history of special relativity consists of many theoretical results and empirical findings obtained by Albert A. Michelson, Hendrik Lorentz, Henri Poincaré and others. It culminated in the theory of special relativity proposed by Albert Einstein and subsequent work of Max Planck, Hermann Minkowski and others.

== Introduction ==
Although Isaac Newton based his physics on absolute time and space, he also adhered to the principle of relativity of Galileo Galilei restating it precisely for mechanical systems. This can be stated: as far as the laws of mechanics are concerned, all observers in inertial motion are equally privileged, and no preferred state of motion can be attributed to any particular inertial observer. However, electromagnetic theory and electrodynamics, developed during the 19th century, did not obey Galileo's relativity. The wave theory of electromagnetism or light viewed as a disturbance of a "light medium" or luminiferous aether was widely accepted. The theory reached its most developed form in the work of James Clerk Maxwell. Maxwell thought all optical and electrical phenomena propagate through an aether, making his equations valid only for systems at rest with respect to that aether. The concept of this aether was widely discussed and subjected to many unsuccessful efforts experimentally determine motion relative to the aether.

The failure of any experiment to detect motion through the aether led Hendrik Lorentz, starting in 1892, to develop a theory of electrodynamics based on an immobile luminiferous aether (about whose material constitution Lorentz did not speculate), physical length contraction, and a "local time" in which Maxwell's equations retain their form in all inertial frames of reference. Working with Lorentz's aether theory, Henri Poincaré, having earlier proposed the "relativity principle" as a general law of nature (including electrodynamics and gravitation), used this principle in 1905 to correct Lorentz's preliminary transformation formulas, resulting in an exact set of equations that are now called the Lorentz transformations.

A little later in the same year Albert Einstein published his original paper on special relativity. He independently derived and radically reinterpreted the Lorentz transformations by changing the fundamental definitions of space and time intervals, while abandoning the absolute simultaneity of Galilean kinematics, avoiding the need for any reference to a luminiferous aether in classical electrodynamics. Before Einstein's paper Galilean relativity applied to particle mechanics and Lorentzian relativity to electrodynamics; afterwards both systems used Lorentz transformations. In subsequent work Hermann Minkowski, introduced a 4-dimensional geometric "spacetime" model, Arnold Sommerfeld developed the electromagnetic tensor, and Max Planck applied the concept of special relativity to relativistic Lagrangian mechanics.

The special theory of relativity gave invariant laws of physics in inertial frames of reference, but the meaning of these frames was unclear until Einstein's later development of his equivalence principle and general theory of relativity. In comparing to the general theory, Einstein specifically called his earlier work "special theory of relativity" (German: Spezielle Relativitätstheorie) in two short papers published in November 1915 and in a long review article published in 1916, saying he meant a restriction to frames in uniform motion, and was featured in the title of Einstein's popular book Relativity: The Special and the General Theory first published in 1916.

== Aether and electrodynamics of moving bodies ==
=== Aether models and Maxwell's equations ===
Following the work of Thomas Young (1804) and Augustin-Jean Fresnel (1816), it was believed that light propagates as a transverse wave within an elastic medium called luminiferous aether. However, a distinction was made between optical and electrodynamical phenomena so it was necessary to create specific aether models for all phenomena. Attempts to unify those models or to create a complete mechanical description of them did not succeed, but after considerable work by many scientists, including Michael Faraday and Lord Kelvin, James Clerk Maxwell (1864) developed an accurate theory of electromagnetism by deriving a set of equations in electricity, magnetism and inductance, named Maxwell's equations. He first proposed that light was in fact undulations (electromagnetic radiation) in the same aetherial medium that is the cause of electric and magnetic phenomena. However, Maxwell's theory was unsatisfactory regarding the optics of moving bodies, and while he was able to present a complete mathematical model, he was not able to provide a coherent mechanical description of the aether.

After Heinrich Hertz in 1887 demonstrated the existence of electromagnetic waves, Maxwell's theory was widely accepted. In addition, Oliver Heaviside and Hertz further developed the theory and introduced modernized versions of Maxwell's equations. The "Maxwell–Hertz" or "Heaviside–Hertz" equations subsequently formed an important basis for the further development of electrodynamics, and Heaviside's notation is still used today. Other important contributions to Maxwell's theory were made by George FitzGerald, Joseph John Thomson, John Henry Poynting, Hendrik Lorentz, and Joseph Larmor.

=== Search for the aether ===
Regarding the relative motion and the mutual influence of matter and aether, there were two theories, neither entirely satisfactory. One was developed by Fresnel (and subsequently Lorentz). This model (stationary aether theory) supposed that light propagates as a transverse wave and aether is partially dragged with a certain coefficient by matter. Based on this assumption, Fresnel was able to explain the aberration of light and many optical phenomena.

The other hypothesis was proposed by George Gabriel Stokes, who stated in 1845 that the aether was fully dragged by matter (later this view was also shared by Hertz). In this model the aether might be (by analogy with pine pitch) rigid for fast objects and fluid for slower objects. Thus the Earth could move through it fairly freely, but it would be rigid enough to transport light. Fresnel's theory was preferred because his dragging coefficient was confirmed by the Fizeau experiment in 1851, which measured the speed of light in moving liquids.

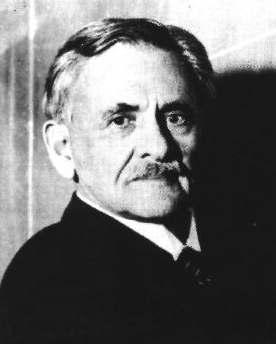
A. A. Michelson

Albert A. Michelson (1881) tried to measure the relative motion of the Earth and aether (the "aether-wind"), as it was expected in Fresnel's theory, by using an interferometer. He could not determine any relative motion, so he interpreted the result as a confirmation of the thesis of Stokes. However, Lorentz (1886) showed Michelson's calculations were wrong and that he had overestimated the accuracy of the measurement. This, together with the large margin of error, made the result of Michelson's experiment inconclusive. In addition, Lorentz showed that Stokes' completely dragged aether led to contradictory consequences, and therefore he supported an aether theory similar to Fresnel's. To check Fresnel's theory again, Michelson and Edward W. Morley (1886) performed a repetition of the Fizeau experiment. Fresnel's dragging coefficient was confirmed very exactly on that occasion, and Michelson was now of the opinion that Fresnel's stationary aether theory was correct. To clarify the situation, Michelson and Morley (1887) repeated Michelson's 1881 experiment, and they substantially increased the accuracy of the measurement. However, this now famous Michelson–Morley experiment again yielded a negative result: no motion of the apparatus through the aether was detected (although the Earth's velocity differs by 60 km/s in the northern winter compared to the summer). So the physicists were confronted with two seemingly contradictory experiments: the 1886 experiment as an apparent confirmation of Fresnel's stationary aether, and the 1887 experiment as an apparent confirmation of Stokes' completely dragged aether.

A possible solution to the problem was shown by Woldemar Voigt (1887), who investigated the Doppler effect for waves propagating in an incompressible elastic medium and deduced transformation relations that left the wave equation in free space unchanged, and explained the negative result of the Michelson–Morley experiment. The Voigt transformations include the Lorentz factor $\frac{1}\sqrt{1-{v^2}/{c^2}}$ for the y- and z-coordinates, and a new time variable $t'=t-\frac{vx}{c^2}$ which later was called "local time". However, Voigt's work was completely ignored by his contemporaries.

FitzGerald (1889) offered another explanation of the negative result of the Michelson–Morley experiment. Contrary to Voigt, he speculated that the intermolecular forces are possibly of electrical origin so that material bodies would contract in the line of motion (length contraction). This was in connection with the work of Heaviside (1887), who determined that the electrostatic fields in motion were deformed (Heaviside Ellipsoid), which leads to physically undetermined conditions at the speed of light. However, FitzGerald's idea remained widely unknown and was not discussed before Oliver Lodge published a summary of the idea in 1892. Also Lorentz (1892b) proposed length contraction independently from FitzGerald in order to explain the Michelson–Morley experiment. For plausibility reasons, Lorentz referred to the analogy of the contraction of electrostatic fields. However, even Lorentz admitted that that was not a necessary reason and length contraction consequently remained an ad hoc hypothesis.

=== Lorentz's theory of electrons ===
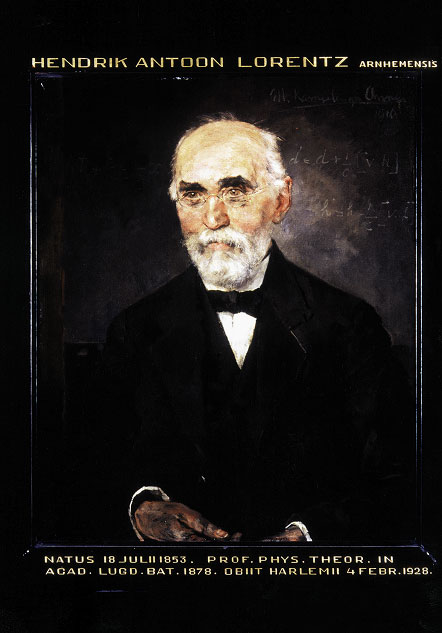
Hendrik Antoon Lorentz

Lorentz (1892a) set the foundations of Lorentz aether theory, by assuming the existence of electrons which he separated from the aether, and by replacing the "Maxwell–Hertz" equations by the "Maxwell–Lorentz" equations. In his model, the aether is completely motionless and, contrary to Fresnel's theory, also is not partially dragged by matter. An important consequence of this notion was that the velocity of light is totally independent of the velocity of the source. Lorentz gave no statements about the mechanical nature of the aether and the electromagnetic processes, but, rather, tried to explain the mechanical processes by electromagnetic ones and therefore created an abstract electromagnetic æther. In the framework of his theory, Lorentz calculated, like Heaviside, the contraction of the electrostatic fields. Lorentz (1895) also introduced what he called the "Theorem of Corresponding States" for terms of first order in $\frac{v}{c}$. This theorem states that a moving observer (relative to the aether) in his "fictitious" field makes the same observations as a resting observer in his "real" field. An important part of it was local time $t'=t-\frac{vx}{c^2}$, which paved the way to the Lorentz transformation and which he introduced independently of Voigt. With the help of this concept, Lorentz could explain the aberration of light, the Doppler effect and the Fizeau experiment as well. However, Lorentz's local time was only an auxiliary mathematical tool to simplify the transformation from one system into another – it was Poincaré in 1900 who recognized that "local time" is actually indicated by moving clocks. Lorentz also recognized that his theory violated the principle of action and reaction, since the aether acts on matter, but matter cannot act on the immobile aether.

A very similar model was created by Joseph Larmor (1897, 1900). Larmor was the first to put Lorentz's 1895 transformation into a form algebraically equivalent to the modern Lorentz transformations, however, he stated that his transformations preserved the form of Maxwell's equations only to second order of $\frac{v}{c}$. Lorentz later noted that these transformations did in fact preserve the form of Maxwell's equations to all orders of $\frac{v}{c}$. Larmor noticed on that occasion that length contraction was derivable from the model; furthermore, he calculated some manner of time dilation for electron orbits. Larmor specified his considerations in 1900 and 1904. Independently of Larmor, Lorentz (1899) extended his transformation for second-order terms and noted a (mathematical) time dilation effect as well.

Other physicists besides Lorentz and Larmor also tried to develop a consistent model of electrodynamics. For example, Emil Cohn (1900, 1901) created an alternative electrodynamics in which he, as one of the first, discarded the existence of the aether (at least in the previous form) and would use, like Ernst Mach, the fixed stars as a reference frame instead. Due to inconsistencies within his theory, like different light speeds in different directions, it was superseded by Lorentz's and Einstein's.

=== Electromagnetic mass ===
During his development of Maxwell's theory, J. J. Thomson (1881) showed that charged bodies in an electrostatic fields behave as if they add an "electromagnetic mass" of $4/3c^2$ times the electrostatic energy. This was interpreted as some form of self-inductance of the electromagnetic field. He also noticed that the mass of a body in motion is increased by a constant quantity. Thomson's work was continued and perfected by FitzGerald, Heaviside (1888), and George Frederick Charles Searle (1896, 1897). For the electromagnetic mass they gave — in modern notation — the formula $m=\frac{4}{3}\frac{E}{c^2}$, where m is the electromagnetic mass and E is the electromagnetic energy. Heaviside and Searle also recognized that the increase of the mass of a body is not constant and varies with its velocity. Consequently, Searle noted the impossibility of superluminal velocities, because infinite energy would be needed to exceed the speed of light. Also for Lorentz (1899), the integration of the speed-dependence of masses recognized by Thomson was especially important. He noticed that the mass not only varied due to speed, but is also dependent on the direction, and he introduced what Abraham later called "longitudinal" and "transverse" mass. (The transverse mass corresponds to what later was called relativistic mass.)

Wilhelm Wien (1900) assumed (following the works of Thomson, Heaviside, and Searle) that the entire mass is of electromagnetic origin, which was formulated in the context that all forces of nature are electromagnetic ones (the "electromagnetic worldview"). Wien stated that, if it is assumed that gravitation is an electromagnetic effect too, then there has to be a proportionality between electromagnetic energy, inertial mass and gravitational mass. In the same paper Henri Poincaré (1900b) found another way of combining the concepts of mass and energy. He recognized that electromagnetic energy behaves like a fictitious fluid with mass density of $m=\frac{E}{c^2}$ (or $E=mc^2$) and defined a fictitious electromagnetic momentum as well. However, he arrived at a radiation paradox which was fully explained by Einstein in 1905.

Walter Kaufmann (1901–1903) was the first to confirm the velocity dependence of electromagnetic mass by analyzing the ratio $\frac{e}{m}$ (where e is the charge and m the mass) of cathode rays. He found that the value of $\frac{e}{m}$ decreased with the speed, showing that, assuming the charge constant, the mass of the electron increased with the speed. He also believed that those experiments confirmed the assumption of Wien, that there is no "real" mechanical mass, but only the "apparent" electromagnetic mass, or in other words, the mass of all bodies is of electromagnetic origin.

Max Abraham (1902–1904), who was a supporter of the electromagnetic worldview, quickly offered an explanation for Kaufmann's experiments by deriving expressions for the electromagnetic mass. Together with this concept, Abraham introduced (like Poincaré in 1900) the notion of "electromagnetic momentum" which is proportional to $\frac{E}{c^2}$. But unlike the fictitious quantities introduced by Poincaré, he considered it as a real, physical entity. Abraham also noted (like Lorentz in 1899) that this mass also depends on the direction and coined the names "longitudinal" and "transverse" mass. In contrast to Lorentz, he did not incorporate the contraction hypothesis into his theory, and therefore his mass terms differed from those of Lorentz.

Based on the preceding work on electromagnetic mass, Friedrich Hasenöhrl suggested that part of the mass of a body (which he called apparent mass) can be thought of as radiation bouncing around a cavity. The "apparent mass" of radiation depends on the temperature (because every heated body emits radiation) and is proportional to its energy. Hasenöhrl stated that this energy–apparent-mass relation only holds as long as the body radiates, that is, if the temperature of a body is greater than 0 K. At first he gave the expression $m=\frac{8}{3}\frac{E}{c^2}$ for the apparent mass; however, Abraham and Hasenöhrl himself in 1905 changed the result to $m=\frac{4}{3}\frac{E}{c^2}$, the same value as for the electromagnetic mass for a body at rest.

=== Absolute space and time ===
Some scientists and philosophers of science were critical of Newton's definitions of absolute space and time. Ernst Mach (1883) argued that absolute time and space are essentially metaphysical concepts and thus scientifically meaningless, and suggested that only relative motion between material bodies is a useful concept in physics. Mach argued that even effects that according to Newton depend on accelerated motion with respect to absolute space, such as rotation, could be described purely with reference to material bodies, and that the inertial effects cited by Newton in support of absolute space might instead be related purely to acceleration with respect to the fixed stars. Carl Neumann (1870) introduced a "Body alpha", which represents some sort of rigid and fixed body for defining inertial motion. Based on the definition of Neumann, Heinrich Streintz (1883) argued that in a coordinate system where gyroscopes do not measure any signs of rotation, inertial motion is related to a "fundamental body" and a "fundamental coordinate system". Eventually, Ludwig Lange (1885) was the first to coin the expression inertial frame of reference and "inertial time scale" as operational replacements for absolute space and time; he defined "inertial frame" as "a reference frame in which a mass point thrown from the same point in three different (non-coplanar) directions follows rectilinear paths each time it is thrown". In 1902, Henri Poincaré published a collection of essays titled Science and Hypothesis, which included: detailed philosophical discussions on the relativity of space and time; the conventionality of distant simultaneity; the conjecture that a violation of the relativity principle can never be detected; the possible non-existence of the aether, together with some arguments supporting the aether; and many remarks on non-Euclidean vs. Euclidean geometry.

There were also some attempts to use time as a fourth dimension. This was done as early as 1754 by Jean le Rond d'Alembert in the Encyclopédie, and by some authors in the 19th century like H. G. Wells in his novel The Time Machine (1895). In 1901 a philosophical model was developed by Menyhért Palágyi, in which space and time were only two sides of some sort of "spacetime". He used time as an imaginary fourth dimension, which he gave the form it (where $i=\sqrt{-1}$ the imaginary unit). However, Palágyi's time coordinate is not connected to the speed of light. He also rejected any connection with the existing constructions of n-dimensional spaces and non-Euclidean geometry, so his philosophical model bears only slight resemblance to spacetime physics, as it was later developed by Minkowski.

=== Light constancy and the principle of relative motion ===
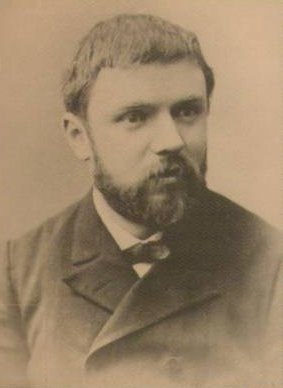
Henri Poincaré

In the second half of the 19th century, there were many attempts to develop a worldwide clock network synchronized by electrical signals. For that endeavor, the finite propagation speed of light had to be considered, because synchronization signals could travel no faster than the speed of light.

In his paper "The Measure of Time" (1898), Henri Poincaré described some important consequences of this process and explained that astronomers, in determining the speed of light, simply assumed that light has a constant speed and that this speed is the same in all directions. Without this postulate, it would be impossible to infer the speed of light from astronomical observations, as Ole Rømer did based on observations of the moons of Jupiter.

Poincaré also noted that the propagation speed of light can be (and in practice often is) used to define simultaneity between spatially separate events:

The simultaneity of two events, or the order of their succession, the equality of two durations, are to be so defined that the enunciation of the natural laws may be as simple as possible. In other words, all these rules, all these definitions are only the fruit of an unconscious opportunism.

— Henri Poincaré, 1898

In some other papers (1895, 1900b), Poincaré argued that experiments like that of Michelson and Morley show the impossibility of detecting the absolute motion of matter, that is, the relative motion of matter in relation to the aether. He called this the "principle of relative motion". In the same year, he interpreted Lorentz's local time as the result of a synchronization procedure based on light signals. He assumed that two observers who are moving in the aether synchronize their clocks by optical signals. Since they believe themselves to be at rest, they consider only the transmission time of the signals and then cross-reference their observations to examine whether their clocks are synchronous. From the point of view of an observer at rest in the aether, the clocks are not synchronous and indicate the local time $t'=t-\frac{vx}{c^2}$, but the moving observers fail to recognize this because they are unaware of their movement. So, contrary to Lorentz, Poincaré-defined local time can be measured and indicated by clocks. Therefore, in his recommendation of Lorentz for the Nobel Prize in 1902, Poincaré argued that Lorentz had convincingly explained the negative outcome of the aether drift experiments by inventing the "diminished" or "local" time, that is, a time coordinate in which two events at different places could appear as simultaneous, although they are not simultaneous in reality.

Like Poincaré, Alfred Bucherer (1903) believed in the validity of the relativity principle within the domain of electrodynamics, but contrary to Poincaré, Bucherer even assumed that this implies the nonexistence of the aether. However, the theory that he created later in 1906 was incorrect and not self-consistent, and the Lorentz transformation was absent within his theory as well.

=== Lorentz's 1904 model ===
In his paper Electromagnetic phenomena in a system moving with any velocity smaller than that of light, Lorentz (1904) was following the suggestion of Poincaré and attempted to create a formulation of electrodynamics which explains the failure of all known aether drift experiments, and thus the validity of the relativity principle. He tried to prove the applicability of the Lorentz transformation for all orders, although he did not succeed completely. Like Wien and Abraham, he argued that there exists only electromagnetic mass, not mechanical mass, and derived the correct expression for longitudinal and transverse mass, which were in agreement with Kaufmann's experiments (even though those experiments were not precise enough to distinguish between the theories of Lorentz and Abraham). And using the electromagnetic momentum, he could explain the negative result of the Trouton–Noble experiment, in which a charged parallel-plate capacitor moving through the aether should orient itself perpendicular to the motion. Also the experiments of Rayleigh and Brace could be explained. Another important step was the postulate that the Lorentz transformation has to be valid for non-electrical forces as well.

At the same time, when Lorentz worked out his theory, Wien (1903) recognized an important consequence of the velocity dependence of mass. He argued that superluminal velocities were impossible, because that would require an infinite amount of energy — the same was already noted by Thomson (1893) and Searle (1897). And in June 1904, after he had read Lorentz's 1904 paper, he noticed the same in relation to length contraction, because at superluminal velocities the factor $\sqrt{1-{v^2}/{c^2}}$ becomes imaginary.

Lorentz's theory was criticized by Abraham, who demonstrated that on one side the theory obeys the relativity principle, and on the other side the electromagnetic origin of all forces is assumed. Abraham showed that both assumptions were incompatible, because in Lorentz's theory of the contracted electrons, non-electric forces were needed in order to guarantee the stability of matter. However, in Abraham's theory of the rigid electron, no such forces were needed. Thus the question arose whether the Electromagnetic conception of the world (compatible with Abraham's theory) or the Relativity Principle (compatible with Lorentz's Theory) was correct.

In a September 1904 lecture in St. Louis named The Principles of Mathematical Physics, Poincaré drew some consequences from Lorentz's theory and defined (in modification of Galileo's Relativity Principle and Lorentz's Theorem of Corresponding States) the following principle: "The Principle of Relativity, according to which the laws of physical phenomena must be the same for a stationary observer as for one carried along in a uniform motion of translation, so that we have no means, and can have none, of determining whether or not we are being carried along in such a motion." He also specified his clock synchronization method and explained the possibility of a "new method" or "new mechanics", in which no velocity can surpass that of light for all observers. However, he critically noted that the relativity principle, Newton's action and reaction, the conservation of mass, and the conservation of energy are not fully established and are even threatened by some experiments.

Also Emil Cohn (1904) continued to develop his alternative model (as described above), and while comparing his theory with that of Lorentz, he discovered some important physical interpretations of the Lorentz transformations. He illustrated (like Joseph Larmor in the same year) this transformation by using rods and clocks: If they are at rest in the aether, they indicate the true length and time, and if they are moving, they indicate contracted and dilated values. Like Poincaré, Cohn defined local time as the time that is based on the assumption of isotropic propagation of light. Contrary to Lorentz and Poincaré, it was noticed by Cohn that within Lorentz's theory the separation of "real" and "apparent" coordinates is artificial, because no experiment can distinguish between them. Yet according to Cohn's own theory, the Lorentz transformed quantities would only be valid for optical phenomena, while mechanical clocks would indicate the "real" time.

=== Poincaré's dynamics of the electron ===
On June 5, 1905, Henri Poincaré submitted the summary of a work which closed the existing gaps of Lorentz's work. (This short paper contained the results of a more complete work which would be published later, in January 1906.) He showed that Lorentz's equations of electrodynamics were not fully Lorentz-covariant. So he pointed out the group characteristics of the transformation, and he corrected Lorentz's formulas for the transformations of charge density and current density (which implicitly contained the relativistic velocity-addition formula, which he elaborated in May in a letter to Lorentz). Poincaré used for the first time the term "Lorentz transformation", and he gave the transformations their symmetrical form used to this day. He introduced a non-electrical binding force (the so-called "Poincaré stresses") to ensure the stability of the electrons and to explain length contraction. He also sketched a Lorentz-invariant model of gravitation (including gravitational waves) by extending the validity of Lorentz-invariance to non-electrical forces.

Eventually Poincaré (independently of Einstein) finished a substantially extended work of his June paper (the so-called "Palermo paper", received July 23, printed December 14, published January 1906 ). He spoke literally of "the postulate of relativity". He showed that the transformations are a consequence of the principle of least action and developed the properties of the Poincaré stresses. He demonstrated in more detail the group characteristics of the transformation, which he called the Lorentz group, and he showed that the combination $x^2+y^2+z^2-c^2t^2$ is invariant. While elaborating his gravitational theory, he said the Lorentz transformation is merely a rotation in four-dimensional space about the origin, by introducing $ct\sqrt{-1}$ as a fourth imaginary coordinate (contrary to Palágyi, he included the speed of light), and he already used four-vectors. He wrote that the discovery of magneto-cathode rays by Paul Ulrich Villard (1904) seemed to threaten the entire theory of Lorentz, but this problem was quickly solved. However, although in his philosophical writings Poincaré rejected the ideas of absolute space and time, in his physical papers he continued to refer to an (undetectable) aether. He also continued (1900b, 1904, 1906, 1908b) to describe coordinates and phenomena as local/apparent (for moving observers) and true/real (for observers at rest in the aether). So, with a few exceptions, most historians of science argue that Poincaré did not invent what is now called special relativity, although it is admitted that Poincaré anticipated much of Einstein's methods and terminology.

== Special relativity ==
=== Einstein 1905 ===
==== Electrodynamics of moving bodies ====
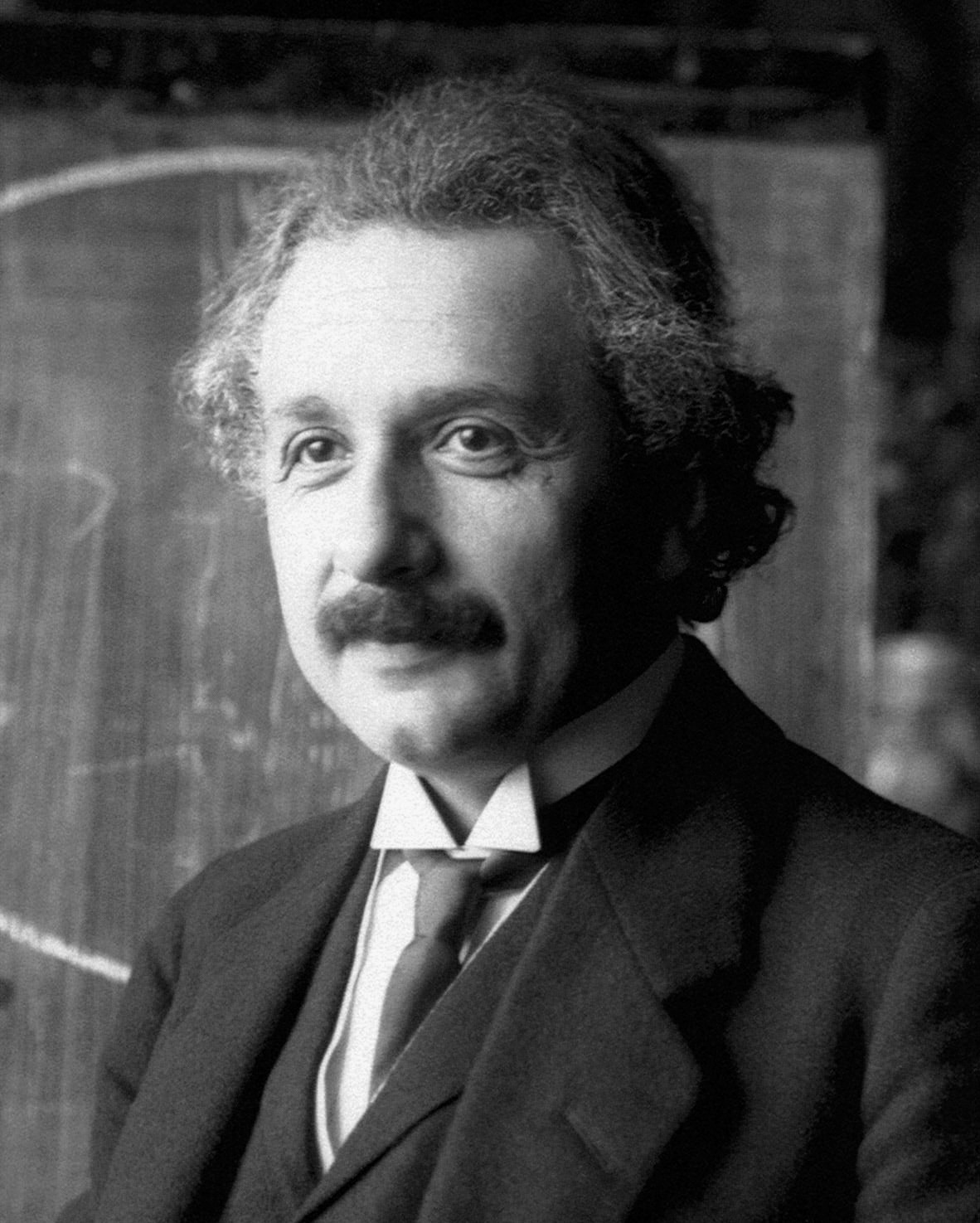
Albert Einstein, 1921

On September 26, 1905 (received June 30), Albert Einstein published his annus mirabilis paper on what is now called special relativity. Einstein's paper includes a fundamental description of the kinematics of the rigid body, and it did not require an absolutely stationary space, such as the aether. Einstein identified two fundamental principles, the principle of relativity and the principle of the constancy of light (light principle), which served as the axiomatic basis of his theory. To better understand Einstein's step, a summary of the situation before 1905, as it was described above, shall be given (it must be remarked that Einstein was familiar with the 1895 theory of Lorentz, and Science and Hypothesis by Poincaré, but possibly not their papers of 1904–1905):

1. Maxwell's electrodynamics, as presented by Lorentz in 1895, was the most successful theory at this time. Here, the speed of light is constant in all directions in the stationary aether and completely independent of the velocity of the source;
2. The inability to find an absolute state of motion, that is, the validity of the relativity principle as the consequence of the negative results of all aether drift experiments and effects like the moving magnet and conductor problem which only depend on relative motion;
3. The Fizeau experiment;
4. The aberration of light;

with the following consequences for the speed of light and the theories known at that time:

1. The speed of light is not composed of the speed of light in vacuum and the velocity of a preferred frame of reference, by b. This contradicts the theory of the (nearly) stationary aether.
2. The speed of light is not composed of the speed of light in vacuum and the velocity of the light source, by a and c. This contradicts the emission theory.
3. The speed of light is not composed of the speed of light in vacuum and the velocity of an aether that would be dragged within or in the vicinity of matter, by a, c, and d. This contradicts the hypothesis of the complete aether drag.
4. The speed of light in moving media is not composed of the speed of light when the medium is at rest and the velocity of the medium, but is determined by Fresnel's dragging coefficient, by c. (Note: For many other experiments on light constancy and relativity, see What is the experimental basis of special relativity?)

In order to make the principle of relativity as required by Poincaré an exact law of nature in the immobile aether theory of Lorentz, the introduction of a variety of ad hoc hypotheses was required, such as the contraction hypothesis, local time, the Poincaré stresses, and so on. This method was criticized by many scholars, since the assumption of a conspiracy of effects which completely prevent the discovery of the aether drift is considered to be very improbable, and it would violate Occam's razor as well. Einstein is considered the first who completely dispensed with such auxiliary hypotheses and drew the direct conclusions from the facts stated above: that the relativity principle is correct and the directly observed speed of light is the same in all inertial reference frames. Based on his axiomatic approach, Einstein was able to derive all results obtained by his predecessors – and in addition the formulas for the relativistic Doppler effect and relativistic aberration – in a few pages, while prior to 1905 his competitors had devoted years of long, complicated work to arrive at the same mathematical formalism. Before 1905 Lorentz and Poincaré had adopted these same principles, as necessary to achieve their final results, but did not recognize that they were also sufficient in the sense that there was no immediate logical need to assume the existence of a stationary aether in order to arrive at the Lorentz transformations. As Lorentz later said, "Einstein simply postulates what we have deduced". Another reason for Einstein's early rejection of the aether in any form (which he later partially retracted) may have been related to his work on quantum physics. Einstein discovered that light can also be described (at least heuristically) as a kind of particle, so the aether as the medium for electromagnetic "waves" (which was highly important for Lorentz and Poincaré) no longer fitted into his conceptual scheme.

Einstein's paper contains no direct references to other papers. However, many historians of science like Holton, Miller, Stachel, have tried to find out possible influences on Einstein. He stated that his thinking was influenced by the empiricist philosophers David Hume and Ernst Mach. Regarding the Relativity Principle, the moving magnet and conductor problem (possibly after reading a book of August Föppl) and the various negative aether drift experiments were important for him to accept that principle — but he denied any significant influence of the most important experiment: the Michelson–Morley experiment. Other likely influences include Poincaré's Science and Hypothesis, where Poincaré presented the Principle of Relativity (which, as has been reported by Einstein's friend Maurice Solovine, was closely studied and discussed by Einstein and his friends over a period of years before the publication of Einstein's 1905 paper), and the writings of Max Abraham, from whom he borrowed the terms "Maxwell–Hertz equations" and "longitudinal and transverse mass".

Regarding his views on Electrodynamics and the Principle of the Constancy of Light, Einstein stated that Lorentz's theory of 1895 (or the Maxwell–Lorentz electrodynamics) and also the Fizeau experiment had considerable influence on his thinking. He said in 1909 and 1912 that he borrowed that principle from Lorentz's stationary aether (which implies validity of Maxwell's equations and the constancy of light in the aether frame), but he recognized that this principle together with the principle of relativity makes any reference to an aether unnecessary (at least as to the description of electrodynamics in inertial frames). As he wrote in 1907 and in later papers, the apparent contradiction between those principles can be resolved if it is admitted that Lorentz's local time is not an auxiliary quantity, but can simply be defined as time and is connected with signal velocity. Before Einstein, Poincaré also developed a similar physical interpretation of local time and noticed the connection with signal velocity, but contrary to Einstein he continued to argue that clocks at rest in the stationary aether show the true time, while clocks in inertial motion relative to the aether show only the apparent time. Eventually, near the end of his life in 1953 Einstein described the advantages of his theory over that of Lorentz as follows (although Poincaré had already stated in 1905 that Lorentz invariance is an exact condition for any physical theory):

There is no doubt, that the special theory of relativity, if we regard its development in retrospect, was ripe for discovery in 1905. Lorentz had already recognized that the transformations named after him are essential for the analysis of Maxwell's equations, and Poincaré deepened this insight still further. Concerning myself, I knew only Lorentz's important work of 1895 […] but not Lorentz's later work, nor the consecutive investigations by Poincaré. In this sense my work of 1905 was independent. […] The new feature of it was the realization of the fact that the bearing of the Lorentz transformation transcended its connection with Maxwell's equations and was concerned with the nature of space and time in general. A further new result was that the "Lorentz invariance" is a general condition for any physical theory. This was for me of particular importance because I had already previously found that Maxwell's theory did not account for the micro-structure of radiation and could therefore have no general validity.

==== Mass–energy equivalence ====
Already in §10 of his paper on electrodynamics, Einstein used the formula

$$E_\text{kin}=mc^2\left(\frac1{\sqrt{1-\frac{v^2} {c^2}}}-1\right)$$

for the kinetic energy of an electron. In elaboration of this he published a paper (received September 27, November 1905), in which Einstein showed that when a material body lost energy (either radiation or heat) of amount E, its mass decreased by the amount $\frac{E}{c^2}$. This led to the famous mass–energy equivalence formula: $E=mc^2$. Einstein considered the equivalency equation to be of paramount importance because it showed that a massive particle possesses an energy, the "rest energy", distinct from its classical kinetic and potential energies. As it was shown above, many authors before Einstein arrived at similar formulas (including a factor of 4/3) for the relation of mass to energy. However, their work was focused on electromagnetic energy which (as we know today) only represents a small part of the entire energy within matter. So it was Einstein who was the first to ascribe this relation to all forms of energy, and to understand the connection of mass–energy equivalence with the relativity principle.

=== Early reception ===
==== First assessments ====
Walter Kaufmann (1905, 1906) was probably the first who referred to Einstein's work. He compared the theories of Lorentz and Einstein and, although he said Einstein's method is to be preferred, he argued that both theories are observationally equivalent. Therefore, he spoke of the relativity principle as the "Lorentz–Einsteinian" basic assumption. Shortly afterwards, Max Planck (1906a) was the first who publicly defended the theory and interested his students, Max von Laue and Kurd von Mosengeil, in this formulation. He described Einstein's theory as a "generalization" of Lorentz's theory and, to this "Lorentz–Einstein Theory", he gave the name "relative theory"; while Alfred Bucherer changed Planck's nomenclature into the now common "theory of relativity" ("Einsteinsche Relativitätstheorie"). On the other hand, Einstein himself and many others continued to refer simply to the new method as the "relativity principle". And in an important overview article on the relativity principle (1908a), Einstein described SR as a "union of Lorentz's theory and the relativity principle", including the fundamental assumption that Lorentz's local time can be described as real time. (Yet, Poincaré's contributions were rarely mentioned in the first years after 1905.) All of those expressions, (Lorentz–Einstein theory, relativity principle, relativity theory) were used by different physicists alternately in the next years.

Following Planck, other German physicists quickly became interested in relativity, including Arnold Sommerfeld, Wilhelm Wien, Max Born, Paul Ehrenfest, and Alfred Bucherer. von Laue, who learned about the theory from Planck, published the first definitive monograph on relativity in 1911. By 1911, Sommerfeld altered his plan to speak about relativity at the Solvay Congress because the theory was already considered well established.

==== Kaufmann–Bucherer-Neumann experiments ====
Kaufmann–Bucherer–Neumann experiments Kaufmann (1903) presented results of his experiments on the charge-to-mass ratio of beta rays from a radium source, showing the dependence of the velocity on mass. He announced that these results confirmed Abraham's theory. However, Lorentz (1904a) reanalyzed results from Kaufmann (1903) against his theory and based on the data in tables concluded (p. 828) that the agreement with his theory "is seen to come out no less satisfactory than" with Abraham's theory. A recent reanalysis of the data from Kaufmann (1903) confirms that Lorentz's theory (1904a) does agree substantially better than Abraham's theory when applied to data from Kaufmann (1903). Kaufmann (1905, 1906) presented further results, this time with electrons from cathode rays. They represented, in his opinion, a clear refutation of the relativity principle and the Lorentz-Einstein-Theory, and a confirmation of Abraham's theory. For some years Kaufmann's experiments represented a weighty objection against the relativity principle, although it was criticized by Planck and Adolf Bestelmeyer (1906). Other physicists working with beta rays from radium, like Alfred Bucherer (1908) and Günther Neumann (1914), following on Bucherer's work and improving on his methods, also examined the velocity-dependence of mass and this time it was thought that the "Lorentz-Einstein theory" and the relativity principle were confirmed, and Abraham's theory disproved. A distinction needs to be made between work with beta ray electrons and cathode ray electrons since beta rays from radium have substantially larger velocities than cathode-ray electrons and so relativistic effects are substantially easier to detect with beta rays. Kaufmann's experiments with electrons from cathode rays only showed a qualitative mass increase of moving electrons, but they were not precise enough to distinguish between the models of Lorentz-Einstein and Abraham. It was not until 1940 that experiments with electrons from cathode rays were repeated with sufficient accuracy for confirming the Lorentz-Einstein formula. However, this problem occurred only with this kind of experiment. The investigations of the fine structure of the hydrogen lines already in 1917 provided a clear confirmation of the Lorentz-Einstein formula and the refutation of Abraham's theory.

==== Relativistic momentum and mass ====
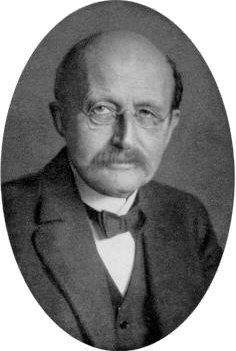
Max Planck

Planck (1906a) defined the relativistic momentum and gave the correct values for the longitudinal and transverse mass by correcting a slight mistake of the expression given by Einstein in 1905. Planck's expressions were in principle equivalent to those used by Lorentz in 1899. Based on the work of Planck, the concept of relativistic mass was developed by Gilbert Newton Lewis and Richard C. Tolman (1908, 1909) by defining mass as the ratio of momentum to velocity. So the older definition of longitudinal and transverse mass, in which mass was defined as the ratio of force to acceleration, became superfluous. Finally, Tolman (1912) interpreted relativistic mass simply as the mass of the body. However, many modern textbooks on relativity do not use the concept of relativistic mass anymore, and mass in special relativity is considered as an invariant quantity.

==== Mass and energy ====
Einstein (1906) showed that the inertia of energy (mass–energy equivalence) is a necessary and sufficient condition for the conservation of the center of mass theorem. On that occasion, he noted that the formal mathematical content of Poincaré's paper on the center of mass (1900b) and his own paper were mainly the same, although the physical interpretation was different in light of relativity.

Kurd von Mosengeil (1906) by extending Hasenöhrl's calculation of black-body radiation in a cavity, derived the same expression for the additional mass of a body due to electromagnetic radiation as Hasenöhrl. Hasenöhrl's idea was that the mass of a body included a contribution from the electromagnetic field; he imagined a body as a cavity containing light. His relationship between mass and energy, like all other pre-Einstein ones, contained incorrect numerical prefactors (see Electromagnetic mass). Eventually Planck (1907) derived the mass–energy equivalence in general within the framework of special relativity, including the binding forces within matter. He acknowledged the priority of Einstein's 1905 work on $E=mc^2$, but Planck judged his own approach as more general than Einstein's.

==== Experiments by Fizeau and Sagnac ====
As was explained above, already in 1895 Lorentz succeeded in deriving Fresnel's dragging coefficient (to first order of $\frac{v}{c}$ and the Fizeau experiment by using the electromagnetic theory and the concept of local time. After first attempts by Jakob Laub (1907) to create a relativistic "optics of moving bodies", it was Max von Laue (1907) who derived the coefficient for terms of all orders by using the colinear case of the relativistic velocity addition law. In addition, Laue's calculation was much simpler than the complicated methods used by Lorentz.

In 1911 von Laue also discussed a situation where on a platform a beam of light is split and the two beams are made to follow the same trajectory in opposite directions. On return to the point of entry the light is allowed to exit the platform in such a way that an interference pattern is obtained. Laue calculated a displacement of the interference pattern if the platform is in rotation – because the speed of light is independent of the velocity of the source, so one beam has covered less distance than the other beam. An experiment of this kind was performed by Georges Sagnac in 1913, who actually measured a displacement of the interference pattern (Sagnac effect). While Sagnac himself concluded that his theory confirmed the theory of an aether at rest, Laue's earlier calculation showed that it is compatible with special relativity as well because, in both theories, the speed of light is independent of the velocity of the source. This effect can be understood as the electromagnetic counterpart of the mechanics of rotation, for example in analogy to a Foucault pendulum. Already in 1909–1911, Franz Harress (1912) performed an experiment which can be considered as a synthesis of the experiments of Fizeau and Sagnac. He tried to measure the dragging coefficient within glass. Contrary to Fizeau he used a rotating device so he found the same effect as Sagnac. While Harress himself misunderstood the meaning of the result, it was shown by von Laue that the theoretical explanation of Harress' experiment is in accordance with the Sagnac effect. Eventually, the Michelson–Gale–Pearson experiment (1925, a variation of the Sagnac experiment) indicated the angular velocity of the Earth itself in accordance with special relativity and a resting aether.

==== Relativity of simultaneity ====
The first derivations of relativity of simultaneity by synchronization with light signals were also simplified. Daniel Frost Comstock (1910) placed an observer in the middle between two clocks A and B. From this observer a signal is sent to both clocks, and in the frame in which A and B are at rest, they synchronously start to run. But from the perspective of a system in which A and B are moving, clock B is first set in motion, and then comes clock A – so the clocks are not synchronized. Also Einstein (1917) created a model with an observer in the middle between A and B. However, in his description two signals are sent from A and B to an observer aboard a moving train. From the perspective of the frame in which A and B are at rest, the signals are sent at the same time and the observer "is hastening towards the beam of light coming from B, whilst he is riding on ahead of the beam of light coming from A. Hence the observer will see the beam of light emitted from B earlier than he will see that emitted from A. Observers who take the railway train as their reference-body must therefore come to the conclusion that the lightning flash B took place earlier than the lightning flash A."

=== Spacetime physics ===
==== Minkowski's spacetime ====
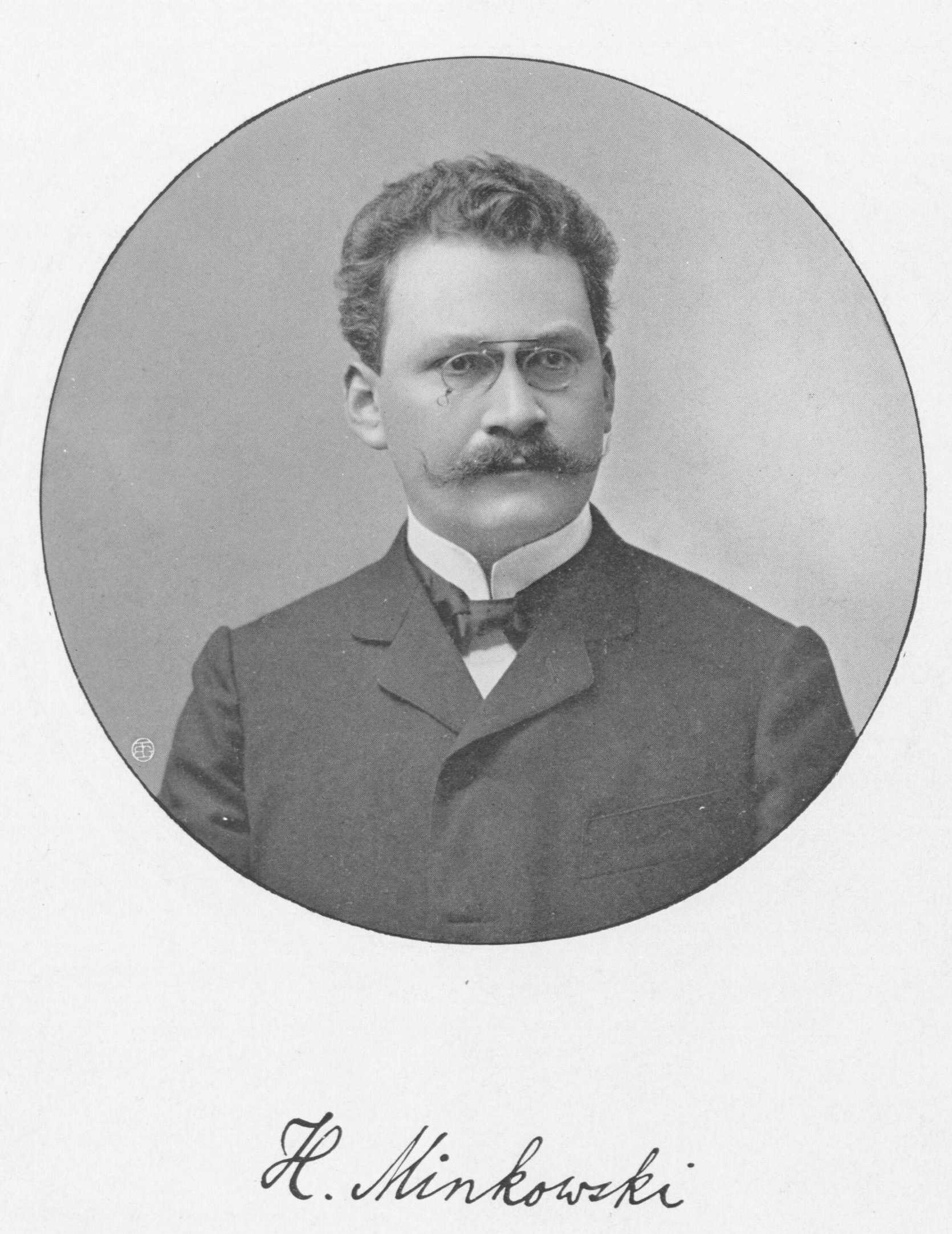
Hermann Minkowski

Poincaré's attempt of a four-dimensional reformulation of the new mechanics was not continued by himself, so it was Hermann Minkowski (1907), who worked out the consequences of that notion (other contributions were made by Roberto Marcolongo (1906) and Richard Hargreaves (1908)). This was based on the work of many mathematicians of the 19th century like Arthur Cayley, Felix Klein, or William Kingdon Clifford, who contributed to group theory, invariant theory and projective geometry, formulating concepts such as the Cayley–Klein metric or the hyperboloid model in which the interval $x_1^2+x_2^2+x_3^2-x_4^2$ and its invariance was defined in terms of hyperbolic geometry. Using similar methods, Minkowski succeeded in formulating a geometrical interpretation of the Lorentz transformation. He completed, for example, the concept of four vectors; he created the Minkowski diagram for the depiction of spacetime; he was the first to use expressions like world line, proper time, Lorentz invariance and covariance, and so on; and most notably he presented a four-dimensional formulation of electrodynamics. Similar to Poincaré he tried to formulate a Lorentz-invariant law of gravity, but that work was subsequently superseded by Einstein's elaborations on gravitation.

In 1907 Minkowski named four predecessors who contributed to the formulation of the relativity principle: Lorentz, Einstein, Poincaré and Planck. And in his famous lecture "Space and Time" (1908) he mentioned Voigt, Lorentz and Einstein. Minkowski himself considered Einstein's theory as a generalization of Lorentz's and credited Einstein for completely stating the relativity of time, but he criticized his predecessors for not fully developing the relativity of space. However, modern historians of science argue that Minkowski's claim for priority was unjustified, because Minkowski (like Wien or Abraham) adhered to the electromagnetic world picture and apparently did not fully understand the difference between Lorentz's electron theory and Einstein's kinematics. In 1908, Einstein and Laub rejected the four-dimensional electrodynamics of Minkowski as overly complicated "learned superfluousness" and published a "more elementary", non-four-dimensional derivation of the basic equations for moving bodies. But it was Minkowski's geometric model that showed that the special relativity is a complete and internally self-consistent theory, that added the Lorentz invariant proper time interval (which accounts for the actual readings shown by moving clocks), and that served as a basis for further development of relativity. Eventually, Einstein (1912) recognized the importance of Minkowski's geometric spacetime model and used it as the basis for his work on the foundations of general relativity.

Today special relativity is seen as an application of linear algebra, but at the time special relativity was being developed the field of linear algebra was still in its infancy. There were no textbooks on linear algebra as modern vector space and transformation theory, and the matrix notation of Arthur Cayley (that unifies the subject) had not yet come into widespread use. Cayley's matrix calculus notation was used by Minkowski (1908) in formulating relativistic electrodynamics, even though it was later replaced by Sommerfeld using vector notation. According to a recent source the Lorentz transformations are equivalent to hyperbolic rotations. However Varićak (1910) had shown that the standard Lorentz transformation is a translation in hyperbolic space.

==== Vector notation and closed systems ====
Minkowski's spacetime formalism was quickly accepted and further developed. For example, Arnold Sommerfeld (1910) replaced Minkowski's matrix notation by an elegant vector notation and coined the terms "four vector" and "six vector". He also introduced a trigonometric formulation of the relativistic velocity addition rule, which according to Sommerfeld, removes much of the strangeness of that concept. Other important contributions were made by Laue (1911, 1913), who used the spacetime formalism to create a relativistic theory of deformable bodies and an elementary particle theory. He extended Minkowski's expressions for electromagnetic processes to all possible forces and thereby clarified the concept of mass–energy equivalence. Laue also showed that non-electrical forces are needed to ensure the proper Lorentz transformation properties, and for the stability of matter – he could show that the "Poincaré stresses" (as mentioned above) are a natural consequence of relativity theory so that the electron can be a closed system.

==== Lorentz transformation without second postulate ====
There were some attempts to derive the Lorentz transformation without the postulate of the constancy of the speed of light. Vladimir Ignatowski (1910) for example used for this purpose the principle of relativity, the homogeneity and isotropy of space, and the requirement of reciprocity. Philipp Frank and Hermann Rothe (1911) argued that this derivation is incomplete and needs additional assumptions. Their own calculation was based on the assumptions: that the Lorentz transformation forms a homogeneous linear group; that when changing frames, only the sign of the relative speed changes; and that length contraction solely depends on the relative speed. However, according to Pauli and Miller such models were insufficient to identify the invariant speed in their transformation with the speed of light — for example, Ignatowski was forced to seek recourse in electrodynamics to include the speed of light. So Pauli and others argued that both postulates are needed to derive the Lorentz transformation. However, until today, others continued the attempts to derive special relativity without the light postulate.

==== Non-euclidean formulations without imaginary time coordinate ====
Minkowski in his earlier works in 1907 and 1908 followed Poincaré in representing space and time together in complex form $(x,y,z,ict)$ emphasizing the formal similarity with Euclidean space. He noted that spacetime is in a certain sense a four-dimensional non-Euclidean manifold. Sommerfeld (1910) used Minkowski's complex representation to combine non-collinear velocities by spherical geometry and so derive Einstein's addition formula. Subsequent writers, principally Varićak, dispensed with the imaginary time coordinate, and wrote in explicitly non-Euclidean (Lobachevskian) form reformulating relativity using the concept of rapidity previously introduced by Alfred Robb (1911); Edwin Bidwell Wilson and Gilbert N. Lewis (1912) introduced a vector notation for spacetime; Émile Borel (1913) showed how parallel transport in non-Euclidean space provides the kinematic basis of Thomas precession twelve years before its experimental discovery by Thomas; Felix Klein (1910) and Ludwik Silberstein (1914) employed such methods as well. One historian argues that the non-Euclidean style had little to show "in the way of creative power of discovery", but it offered notational advantages in some cases, particularly in the law of velocity addition. So in the years before World War I, the acceptance of the non-Euclidean style was approximately equal to that of the initial spacetime formalism, and it continued to be employed in relativity textbooks of the 20th century.

==== Time dilation and twin paradox ====
Einstein (1907a) proposed a method for detecting the transverse Doppler effect as a direct consequence of time dilation. And in fact, that effect was measured in 1938 by Herbert E. Ives and G. R. Stilwell (Ives–Stilwell experiment). And Lewis and Tolman (1909) described the reciprocity of time dilation by using two light clocks A and B, traveling with a certain relative velocity to each other. The clocks consist of two plane mirrors parallel to one another and to the line of motion. Between the mirrors a light signal is bouncing, and for the observer resting in the same reference frame as A, the period of clock A is the distance between the mirrors divided by the speed of light. But if the observer looks at clock B, he sees that within that clock the signal traces out a longer, angled path, thus clock B is slower than A. However, for the observer moving alongside B the situation is completely in reverse: Clock B is faster and A is slower. Lorentz (1910–1912) discussed the reciprocity of time dilation and analyzed a clock "paradox", which apparently occurs as a consequence of the reciprocity of time dilation. Lorentz showed that there is no paradox if one considers that in one system only one clock is used, while in the other system two clocks are necessary, and the relativity of simultaneity is fully taken into account.

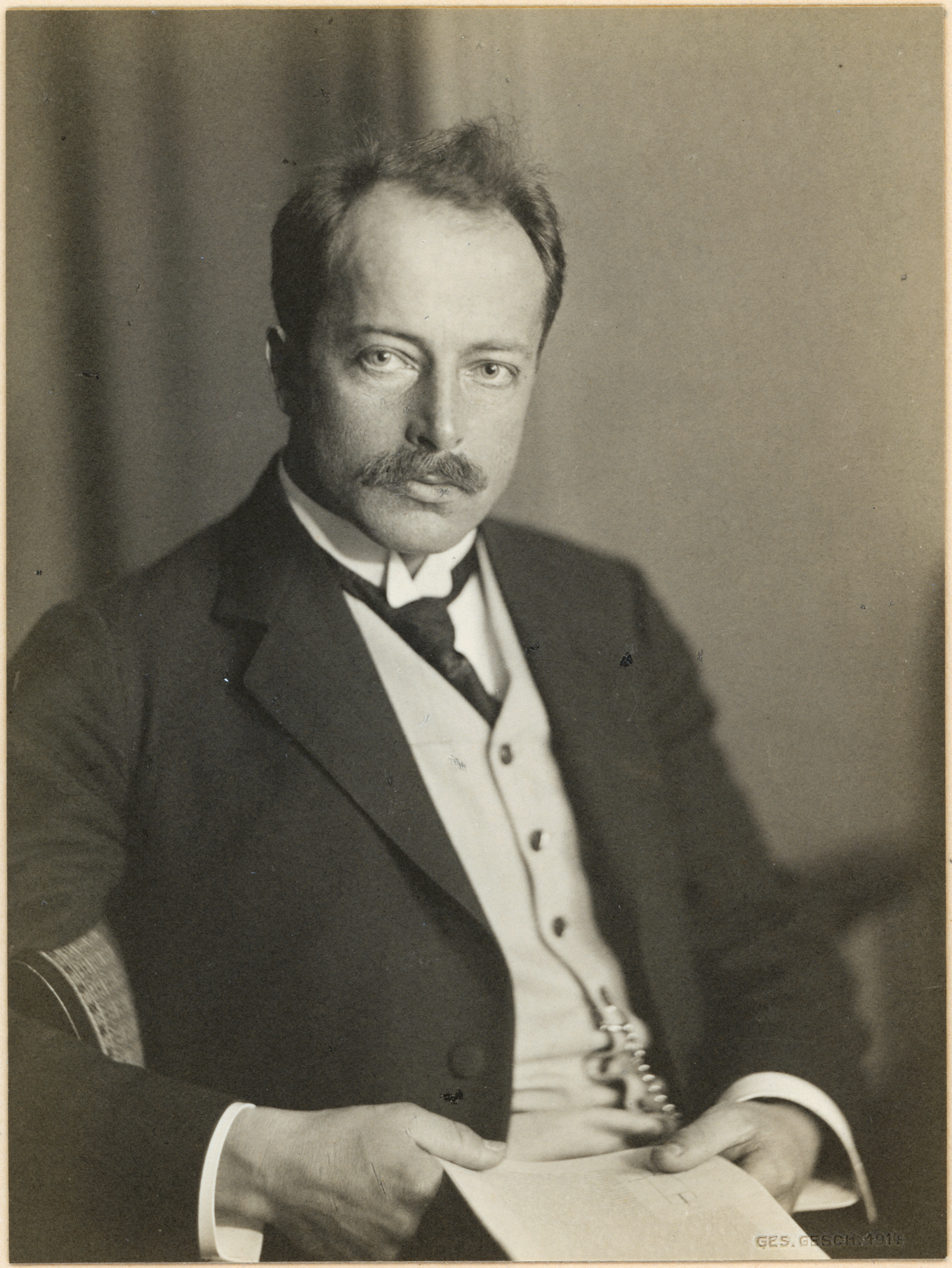
Max von Laue

A similar situation was created by Paul Langevin in 1911 with what was later called the "twin paradox", where he replaced the clocks by persons (Langevin never used the word "twins" but his description contained all other features of the paradox). Langevin solved the paradox by alluding to the fact that one twin accelerates and changes direction, so Langevin could show that the symmetry is broken and the accelerated twin is younger. However, Langevin himself interpreted this as a hint as to the existence of an aether. Although Langevin's explanation is still accepted by some, his conclusions regarding the aether were not generally accepted. Laue (1913) pointed out that any acceleration can be made arbitrarily small in relation to the inertial motion of the twin, and that the real explanation is that one twin is at rest in two different inertial frames during his journey, while the other twin is at rest in a single inertial frame. Laue was also the first to analyze the situation based on Minkowski's spacetime model for special relativity – showing how the world lines of inertially moving bodies maximize the proper time elapsed between two events.

==== Acceleration ====
Einstein (1908) tried – as a preliminary in the framework of special relativity – also to include accelerated frames within the relativity principle. In the course of this attempt he recognized that for any single moment of acceleration of a body one can define an inertial reference frame in which the accelerated body is temporarily at rest. It follows that in accelerated frames defined in this way, the application of the constancy of the speed of light to define simultaneity is restricted to small localities. However, the equivalence principle that was used by Einstein in the course of that investigation, which expresses the equality of inertial and gravitational mass and the equivalence of accelerated frames and homogeneous gravitational fields, transcended the limits of special relativity and resulted in the formulation of general relativity.

Nearly simultaneously with Einstein, Minkowski (1908) considered the special case of uniform accelerations within the framework of his spacetime formalism. He recognized that the worldline of such an accelerated body corresponds to a hyperbola. This notion was further developed by Born (1909) and Sommerfeld (1910), with Born introducing the expression "hyperbolic motion". He noted that uniform acceleration can be used as an approximation for any form of acceleration within special relativity. In addition, Harry Bateman and Ebenezer Cunningham (1910) showed that Maxwell's equations are invariant under a much wider group of transformation than the Lorentz group, namely the spherical wave transformations, being a form of conformal transformations. Under those transformations the equations preserve their form for some types of accelerated motions. A general covariant formulation of electrodynamics in Minkowski space was eventually given by Friedrich Kottler (1912), whereby his formulation is also valid for general relativity. Concerning the further development of the description of accelerated motion in special relativity, the works by Langevin and others for rotating frames (Born coordinates), and by Wolfgang Rindler and others for uniform accelerated frames (Rindler coordinates) must be mentioned.

==== Rigid bodies and Ehrenfest paradox ====
Einstein (1907b) discussed the question of whether, in rigid bodies, as well as in all other cases, the velocity of information can exceed the speed of light, and explained that information could be transmitted under these circumstances into the past, thus causality would be violated. Since this contravenes radically against every experience, superluminal velocities are thought impossible. He added that a dynamics of the rigid body must be created in the framework of SR. Eventually, Max Born (1909) in the course of his above-mentioned work concerning accelerated motion, tried to include the concept of rigid bodies into SR. However, Paul Ehrenfest (1909) showed that Born's concept leads to the so-called Ehrenfest paradox, in which, due to length contraction, the circumference of a rotating disk is shortened while the radius stays the same. This question was also considered by Gustav Herglotz (1910), Fritz Noether (1910), and von Laue (1911). It was recognized by Laue that the classic concept is not applicable in SR since a "rigid" body possesses infinitely many degrees of freedom. Yet, while Born's definition was not applicable on rigid bodies, it was very useful in describing rigid motions of bodies. In connection to the Ehrenfest paradox, it was also discussed (by Vladimir Varićak and others) whether length contraction is "real" or "apparent", and whether there is a difference between the dynamic contraction of Lorentz and the kinematic contraction of Einstein. However, it was rather a dispute over words because, as Einstein said, the kinematic length contraction is "apparent" for a co-moving observer, but for an observer at rest it is "real" and the consequences are measurable.

==== Acceptance of special relativity ====
Planck, in 1909, compared the implications of the modern relativity principle — he particularly referred to the relativity of time – with the revolution by the Copernican system. Poincaré made a similar analogy in 1905. An important factor in the adoption of special relativity by physicists was its development by Poincaré and Minkowski into a spacetime theory. Consequently, by about 1911, most theoretical physicists accepted special relativity. In 1912 Wilhelm Wien recommended both Lorentz (for the mathematical framework) and Einstein (for reducing it to a simple principle) for the Nobel Prize in Physics – although it was decided by the Nobel committee not to award the prize for special relativity. Only a minority of theoretical physicists such as Abraham, Lorentz, Poincaré, or Langevin still believed in the existence of an aether. Einstein later (1918–1920) qualified his position by arguing that one can speak about a relativistic aether, but the "idea of motion" cannot be applied to it. Lorentz and Poincaré had always argued that motion through the aether was undetectable. Einstein used the expression "special theory of relativity" in 1915, to distinguish it from general relativity.

=== Relativistic theories ===
==== Gravitation ====
The first attempt to formulate a relativistic theory of gravitation was undertaken by Poincaré (1905). He tried to modify Newton's law of gravitation so that it assumes a Lorentz-covariant form. He noted that there were many possibilities for a relativistic law, and he discussed two of them. It was shown by Poincaré that the argument of Pierre-Simon Laplace, who argued that the speed of gravity is many times faster than the speed of light, is not valid within a relativistic theory. That is, in a relativistic theory of gravitation, planetary orbits are stable even when the speed of gravity is equal to that of light. Similar models to that of Poincaré were discussed by Minkowski (1907b) and Sommerfeld (1910). However, it was shown by Abraham (1912) that those models belong to the class of "vector theories" of gravitation. The fundamental defect of those theories is that they implicitly contain a negative value for the gravitational energy in the vicinity of matter, which would violate the energy principle. As an alternative, Abraham (1912) and Gustav Mie (1913) proposed different "scalar theories" of gravitation. While Mie never formulated his theory in a consistent way, Abraham completely gave up the concept of Lorentz-covariance (even locally), and therefore it was irreconcilable with relativity.

In addition, all of those models violated the equivalence principle, and Einstein argued that it is impossible to formulate a theory which is both Lorentz-covariant and satisfies the equivalence principle. However, Gunnar Nordström (1912, 1913) was able to create a model which fulfilled both conditions. This was achieved by making both the gravitational and the inertial mass dependent on the gravitational potential. Nordström's theory of gravitation was remarkable because it was shown by Einstein and Adriaan Fokker (1914), that in this model gravitation can be completely described in terms of spacetime curvature. Although Nordström's theory is without contradiction, from Einstein's point of view a fundamental problem persisted: It does not fulfill the important condition of general covariance, as in this theory preferred frames of reference can still be formulated. So contrary to those "scalar theories", Einstein (1911–1915) developed a "tensor theory" (general relativity), which fulfills both the equivalence principle and general covariance. As a consequence, the notion of a complete "special relativistic" theory of gravitation had to be given up, as in general relativity the constancy of light speed (and Lorentz covariance) is only locally valid. The decision between those models was brought about by Einstein, when he was able to exactly derive the perihelion precession of Mercury, while the other theories gave erroneous results. In addition, only Einstein's theory gave the correct value for the deflection of light near the Sun.

==== Quantum field theory ====
The need to put together relativity and quantum mechanics was one of the major motivations in the development of quantum field theory. Pascual Jordan and Wolfgang Pauli showed in 1928 that quantum fields could be made to be relativistic, and Paul Dirac produced the Dirac equation for electrons, and in so doing predicted the existence of antimatter.

Many other domains have since been reformulated with relativistic treatments, including relativistic thermodynamics, relativistic statistical mechanics, relativistic hydrodynamics, relativistic quantum chemistry, and relativistic heat conduction.

=== Experimental evidence ===
Important early experiments confirming special relativity as mentioned above were the Fizeau experiment, the Michelson–Morley experiment, the Kaufmann–Bucherer–Neumann experiments, the Trouton–Noble experiment, the experiments of Rayleigh and Brace, and the Trouton–Rankine experiment.

In the 1920s, a series of Michelson–Morley type experiments were conducted, confirming relativity to even higher precision than the original experiment. Another type of interferometer experiment was the Kennedy–Thorndike experiment in 1932, by which the independence of the speed of light from the velocity of the apparatus was confirmed. Time dilation was directly measured in the Ives–Stilwell experiment in 1938 and by measuring the decay rates of moving particles in 1940. All of those experiments have been repeated several times with increased precision. In addition, that the speed of light is unreachable for massive bodies was measured in many tests of relativistic energy and momentum. Therefore, knowledge of those relativistic effects is required in the construction of particle accelerators.

In 1962 J. G. Fox pointed out that all previous experimental tests of the constancy of the speed of light were conducted using light which had passed through stationary material: glass, air, or the incomplete vacuum of deep space. As a result, all were thus subject to the effects of the extinction theorem. This implied that the light being measured would have had a velocity different from that of the original source. He concluded that there was likely as yet no acceptable proof of the second postulate of special relativity. This surprising gap in the experimental record was quickly closed in the ensuing years, by experiments by Fox, and by Alvager et al., which used gamma rays sourced from high energy mesons. The high energy levels of the measured photons, along with very careful accounting for extinction effects, eliminated any significant doubt from their results.

Many other tests of special relativity have been conducted, testing possible violations of Lorentz invariance in certain variations of quantum gravity. However, no sign of anisotropy of the speed of light has been found even at the 10^{−17} level, and some experiments even ruled out Lorentz violations at the 10^{−40} level, see Modern searches for Lorentz violation.

=== Priority ===
Some claim that Poincaré and Lorentz, not Einstein, are the true discoverers of special relativity. For more see the article on relativity priority dispute.

=== Criticisms ===
Early criticisms of the theory of special relativity for various reasons – such as lack of empirical evidence, internal inconsistencies, rejection of mathematical physics per se, or philosophical reasons – have been turned back by many successful experimental confirmations and uses of the theory. The theory is now considered one of the fundamental laws of nature.

== See also ==
- Timeline of special relativity and the speed of light
- Einstein's thought experiments
- History of Lorentz transformations
- Tests of special relativity
