= Palagyi =

Palagyi or Palágyi is a Hungarian surname. Notable people with the surname include:

- Gergely Palágyi (born 1979), Hungarian hurdler
- Lajos Palágyi (1866–1933), Hungarian poet
- Menyhért Palágyi (1859–1924), Hungarian philosopher, mathematician, and physicist
- Mike Palagyi (1917–2013), American Major League Baseball pitcher
