= Heinrich Streintz =

Austrian physicist (1848–1892)

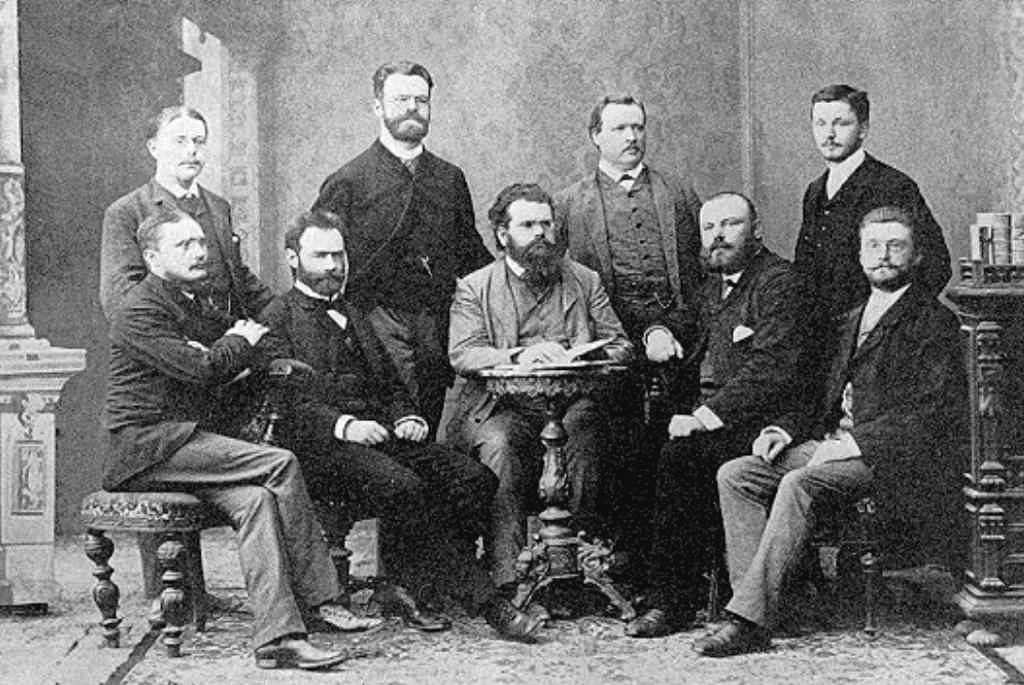
Heinrich Streintz and colleagues in Graz, 1887. (standing, from the left) Nernst, Streintz, Arrhenius, Hiecke, (sitting, from the left) Aulinger, Ettingshausen, Boltzmann, Klemenčič, Hausmanninger

Heinrich Streintz (May 7, 1848 in Vienna – November 11, 1892 in Graz ) was an Austrian physicist.

Due to the frequent diseases of their son, the parents of Streintz moved to Graz. There, he visited High School which he passed with great success in 1868. Soon the mathematical abilities of Streintz were discovered, so he occupied the subjects mathematics, physics and chemistry at the University of Graz. Temporarily he studied also in Leipzig, Munich, and Zurich. In Graz he attained a doctorate in 1872, and then he studied for some time under Gustav Robert Kirchhoff and Leo Königsberger in Heidelberg. Afterwards he worked in Vienna under Josef Stefan at the Physical Institute, where he finished the habilitation and became a private lecturer in 1873. In 1875, he was appointed as an extraordinary professor for mathematical physics to Graz, where he also became an ordinary professor in 1885. One of his colleagues in Graz was Ludwig Boltzmann.

In his scientific work (both theoretically and experimentally) Streintz was concerned with probability theory, elasticity, and electricity. Streintz also wrote many abstracts and reviews for the Deutsche Literaturzeitung and for Austrian High Schools. However, his most important paper was "The physical foundations of mechanics" (German: Die physikalischen Grundlagen der Mechanik, 1883), where he criticized Newton's definitions of inertia, and introduced the expression "Fundamental body" (German: Fundamentalkörper) and "Fundamental Coordinate System" (German: Fundamental-Koordinatensystem), by which inertial motion should be defined more exactly. Similar considerations led shortly thereafter (1885) to the introduction of the term inertial frame of reference by Ludwig Lange.

== Publications ==
- Über die Änderungen der Elastizität und der Länge eines vom galvanischen Strome durchflossenen Drahtes, 1873.
- Die elektrischen Nachströme transversal magnetisirter Eisenstäbe, 1877
- Beiträge zur Kenntnis der elastischen Nachwirkung, 1879
- Die physikalischen Grundlagen der Mechanik. 1883

== See also ==
- Relativity principle and light constancy
