= Friedrich Hasenöhrl =

Austrian physicist (1874–1915)

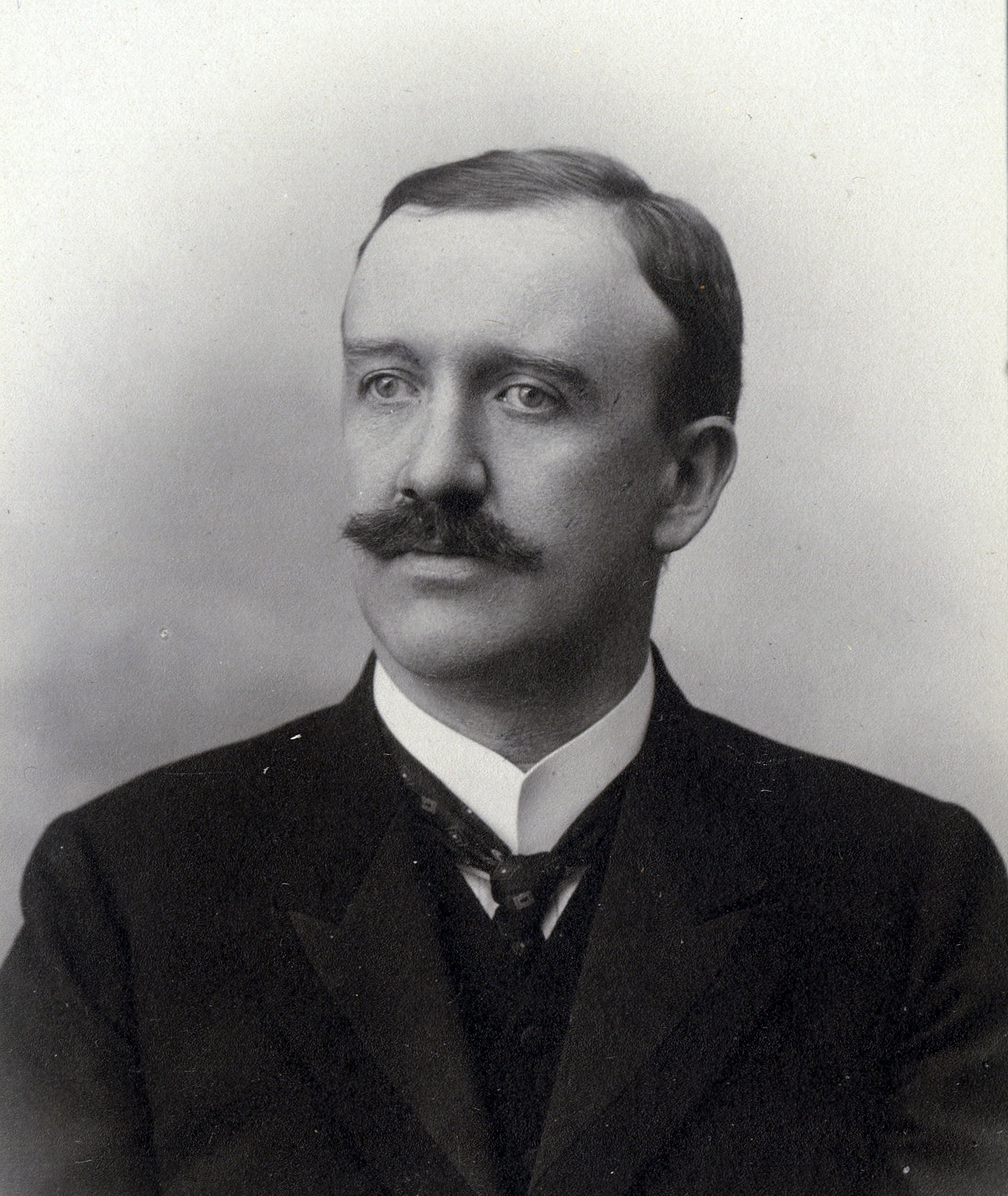
- Friedrich Hasenöhrl
- Born: 30 November 1874; Vienna, Austria-Hungary
- Died: 7 October 1915 (aged 40); Vielgereuth, Welschtirol, Austria-Hungary
- Education: University of Vienna (PhD)
- Known for: Electromagnetic mass
- Awards: Haitinger Prize (1905)
- Scientific career
- Fields: Physicist
- Workplaces: University of Vienna
- Thesis: Über den Temperaturkoeffizienten der Dielektrizitätskonstante in Flüssigkeiten und die Mosotti-Clausius'sche Formel (1896)
- Doctoral advisor: Franz S. Exner
- Doctoral students: Karl Herzfeld; Erwin Schrödinger

Friedrich Hasenöhrl (German: [ˈhaːzn̩øːɐ̯l]; 30 November 1874 – 7 October 1915) was an Austrian physicist and professor of the University of Vienna. He postulated a relation between electromagnetic mass and energy, close to the modern mass–energy equivalence.

He was killed in action during World War I.

== Life ==
Friedrich Hasenöhrl was born in Vienna, Austria-Hungary in 1874. His father was a lawyer, and his mother belonged to a prominent aristocratic family. After his elementary education, he studied natural science and mathematics at the University of Vienna under Joseph Stefan (1835–1893) and Ludwig Boltzmann (1844–1906). In 1896, he attained a doctorate under Franz-Serafin Exner with a thesis titled "Über den Temperaturkoeffizienten der Dielektrizitätskonstante in Flüssigkeiten und die Mosotti-Clausius'sche Formel".

He worked under Heike Kamerlingh Onnes in Leiden at the low-temperature laboratory, and there he also befriended H. A. Lorentz.

In 1907 he became Boltzmann's successor at the University of Vienna as the head of the Department of Theoretical Physics. He had a number of illustrious pupils there and had an especially significant impact on Erwin Schrödinger, who later won the Nobel Prize in Physics for his contributions to quantum mechanics.

In an autobiography, Schrödinger claimed "no other human being had a greater influence on me than Fritz Hasenöhrl, except perhaps my father Rudolph".

When the First World War broke out in 1914, he volunteered at once for the Austro-Hungarian army. He fought as an Oberleutnant against the Italians in Tyrol. He was wounded, recovered and returned to the front. He was then killed by a grenade in an attack on Mount Plaut (Folgaria) on 7 October 1915 at the age of 40.

== Cavity radiation ==
Since J. J. Thomson in 1881, many physicists like Wilhelm Wien (1900), Max Abraham (1902), and Hendrik Lorentz (1904) used equations equivalent to

$$m_{em}=\frac{4}{3} \cdot \frac{E_{\rm em}}{c^2}$$

for the so-called "electromagnetic mass", which expresses how much electromagnetic energy contributes to the mass of bodies.

Following this line of thought, Hasenöhrl (1904, 1905) published several papers on the inertia of a cavity containing radiation. (Note: Zur Theorie der Strahlung bewegter Körper (1904), Sitzungsberichte der mathematisch-naturwissenschaftlichen Klasse der kaiserlichen Akademie der Wissenschaften, Wien. 113 IIa, 1039.: English Wikisource translation: On the Theory of Radiation of Moving Bodies.) (Note: Zur Theorie der Strahlung in bewegten Körpern (1904), Annalen der Physik 15, 344-370.: English Wikisource translation: On the Theory of Radiation in Moving Bodies.) This was an entirely classical (non-relativistic) derivation and used James Clerk Maxwell's equation for the pressure of light. Hasenöhrl specifically associated the "apparent" mass via inertia with the energy concept through the equation:

$$\mu=\frac{8}{3}\frac{E_{0}}{\mathfrak{B}^{2}}$$,

where μ is the apparent mass, E_{0} is the radiation energy, and $\mathfrak{B}$ the speed of light. Subsequently, he used the notation:

$$m=\frac{8}{3} \cdot \frac{h \, \varepsilon_0}{c^2}$$,

where hε_{0} is the radiation energy. He also concluded that this result is valid for all radiating bodies, i.e. for all bodies whose temperature is > 0K. For this result Hasenöhrl was awarded the Haitinger Prize of the Austrian Academy of Sciences. He wrote in 1904:

Since the heat content of every body partly consists of radiating heat, the things that we have demonstrated at a cavity, are true mutatis mutandis for every body whose temperature is different from 0° A.. In particular, every body must have an apparent mass determined by the inner radiation, and which is therefore above all dependent on the temperature.

However, it was shown by Abraham that Hasenöhrl's calculation for the apparent mass was incorrect, so he published another paper in 1905, where he presented Abraham's criticism and corrected his formula to: (Note: Zur Theorie der Strahlung in bewegten Körpern. Berichtigung (1905), Annalen der Physik 16, 589-592).: English Wikisource translation: On the Theory of Radiation in Moving Bodies. Correction.)

$$m=\frac{4}{3} \cdot \frac{h \, \varepsilon_0}{c^2}$$

This was the same relation (as Hasenöhrl noted himself) as for the electromagnetic mass formula given above. Hasenöhrl's results (concerning apparent mass and thermodynamics) by using cavity radiation was further elaborated and criticized by Kurd von Mosengeil (1906/7) who already incorporated Albert Einstein's theory of relativity in his work. A broad outline of relativistic thermodynamics and mass-energy equivalence using cavity radiation was given by Max Planck in 1907.

In some additional papers (1907, 1908) (Note: Zur Thermodynamik bewegter Systeme and Zur Thermodynamik bewegter Systeme (Fortsetzung) (1907-1908), Sitzungsberichte der mathematisch-naturwissenschaftlichen Klasse der kaiserlichen Akademie der Wissenschaften, Wien. 116 IIa (9): 1391-1405, 1907 and 117 IIa (2): 207-215, 1908): English Wikisource translation: On the Thermodynamics of Moving Systems.) Hasenöhrl elaborated further on his 1904-work and concluded that his new results were now in accordance to the theories of Mosengeil and Planck. However, he complained about the fact that Planck (1907) did not mention his earlier 1904-results (like the dependency of apparent mass on temperature). In 1908 Planck wrote that the results of Hasenöhrl's new approach from 1907 were indeed equivalent to those of relativity.

Afterwards, several authors gave credit to Hasenöhrl for his 1904 achievements on cavity radiation.

That the black body radiation possesses inertia was first pointed out by F. Hasenöhrl.

— Max Planck, 1909.

Radiation in a moving cavity. This case is of historic interest, since it can be treated by electrodynamics alone, even without relativity theory. Then one necessarily comes to ascribe momentum and thus inertial mass to the moving radiation energy. It's interesting that this result was already found by F. Hasenöhrl before the introduction of relativity theory. However, his conclusions were in some points in need of correction. A complete solution of this problem was first given by K. v. Mosengeil.

— Wolfgang Pauli, 1921

=== Explanations ===
There are different explanations for this result and its deviation from the relativistic formula $E=mc^2$. Enrico Fermi and others argued that this problem is analogous to the so-called 4/3 problem of electromagnetic mass. That is, if Hasenöhrl had included the shell in his calculations in a way consistent with relativity, the pre-factor of 4/3 would have been 1, so yielding $m = E/c^2$. He could not have done this, since he did not have relativistic mechanics, with which he could model the shell.

On the other hand, Stephen Boughn and Tony Rothman in 2011 (and Boughn in 2012), who gave a historical account of different solutions to the problem, argued that the above explanation is insufficient. After providing a complete relativistic description and solution of the cavity problem (in the "constant velocity case" and "slow acceleration case"), they wrote:

... more generally the reason he [Hasenöhrl] achieved an incorrect result on both occasions is that he wants to rigorously equate the work performed to kinetic energy, as the work-energy theorem demands. Unfortunately, he does not know how to properly compute the energy. In particular, Hasenöhrl does not conceive of the fact that if the radiators are losing energy, they must be losing mass, which contains an element of irony because it is precisely a mass-energy relation that he is trying to establish. [...]
Let us end by saying that Fritz Hasenöhrl attempted a legitimate thought experiment and tackled it with the tools available at the time. He was working during a transition period and did not create the new theory necessary to allow him to solve the problem correctly and completely. Nevertheless, his basic conclusion remained valid and for that he should be given credit.

== Hasenöhrl and Einstein ==
The equations for electromagnetic mass, like those of Hasenöhrl's (for example, Oliver Heaviside (1889), Henri Poincaré (1900), Abraham (1902)), formally similar to the famous Einstein's (1905) equation for mass–energy equivalence, that of which the special case of a stationary massive body is widely known as $E=mc^2$, have often prompted uninformed questioning of Einstein's priority of the discovery, starting soon after his publication and continuing to this day.

Max von Laue clarified as early as 1921 that, while the inertia of electromagnetic energy had been known long before Hasenöhrlt, Einstein was indeed the first to establish the equivalence of real mass and the total energy-momentum content and understand the deep implications of this principle in relativity.

== Known Family ==
- Married Ella Brückner and had at least one known son, Victor Hasenohrl (? - 1982), who married Elizabeth Sayre (? - 1968)
  - Victor Hasenohrl (? - 1982) who married Elizabeth Sayre (? - 1968) had three adopted children:
    - Frederick Hasenohrl [deceased] who married Victoria ? (?-?) who had two children:
      - Children:
        - Frederick Hasenohrl (?- )
        - Issca (?- )
    - Elizabeth Sayre Reich (1937-2015) who married Joseph D. Reich (1928-2000) who had two adopted children:
      - Children:
        - Daniel Stuart Reich (1964- ) who lives in Lutherville, Maryland, USA.
        - Eric Kent Reich (1966- ) who lives in Boyds, Maryland, USA.
    - Margaret Hasenohrl (1942- ) who never married and resides in Silver Spring, Maryland, USA.

== Publications ==
Hasenöhrl's papers on cavity radiation and thermodynamics

== See also ==
- Mass–energy equivalence
- History of special relativity
