= Jakob Laub =

Physicist from Austria-Hungary

Jakob Johann Laub
- Born: 7 February 1882; Rzeszów
- Died: 22 April 1962 (aged 78); Fribourg
- Known for: work on special relativity with Albert Einstein
- Scientific career
- Fields: physics

Jakob Johann Laub (born as Jakub Laub, 7 February 1884 in Rzeszów – 22 April 1962 in Fribourg) was a physicist from Austria-Hungary, who is best known for his work with Albert Einstein in the early period of special relativity.

== Life ==
He was the son of Abraham Laub and Anna Maria Schenborn. Laub, who converted from the Jewish to the Catholic faith and changed his name from "Jakub" into "Jakob Johann", first visited High School in Rzeszów. Next stations were the University of Vienna, the University of Kraków and finally the University of Göttingen, where he studied mathematics under David Hilbert, Woldemar Voigt, Walther Nernst, Karl Schwarzschild and Hermann Minkowski. Afterwards he went to the University of Würzburg, where he attained a doctorate in 1907. Soon he established closer contact to Wilhelm Wien, Arnold Sommerfeld, Johannes Stark, and Albert Einstein. When he travelled to Bern in 1908 to visit Einstein (with whom it corresponded later frequently and was friendly) he found him still working as a patent employee. This he called a "stair joke [Treppenwitz] of history". In 1909 he became co-worker of Philipp Lenard at the University of Heidelberg.

In 1911 he emigrated with his wife Ruth Elisa Wendt to Argentina. There he worked at the geophysical and astronomical observatory in La Plata. Afterwards he obtained a leading position at a Physics Department in Buenos Aires. After accepting the Argentine nationality (with the Spanish first name variant "Jacobo Juan") he began to work in the Diplomatic service of Argentina. In 1947 he returned to Germany. In his new home town Freiburg he went into economic troubles and therefore sold a part of his correspondence with Einstein.

== Scientific Work ==
In 1905 he investigated cathode rays together with Wilhelm Wien. Afterwards he investigated some topics on special relativity and wrote in 1907 an important work on the optics of moving bodies. In 1908 he wrote several works together with Einstein on the basic electromagnetic equations, which was aimed to replace the four-dimensional formulation of the electrodynamics by Minkowski by a simpler, classical formulation. Both Laub and Einstein discounted the spacetime formalism as too complicated. However, it turned out that Minkowski's spacetime formalism was fundamental for the further development of special relativity. Laub also published some papers on relativistic effects within gases and in 1910 he wrote one of the first survey articles on relativity. Also in the following years Laub still wrote many scientific papers on different topics.

== Publications ==
- Laub, J. (1907), "Über sekundäre Kathodenstrahlen", Annalen der Physik, 328 (7): 285–300, Bibcode:1907AnP...328..285L, doi:10.1002/andp.19073280708
- Laub, J. (1907), "Zur Optik der bewegten Körper", Annalen der Physik, 328 (9): 738–744, Bibcode:1907AnP...328..738L, doi:10.1002/andp.19073280910
- Laub, J. (1908), "Zur Optik der bewegten Körper II", Annalen der Physik, 330 (1): 175–184, Bibcode:1908AnP...330..175L, doi:10.1002/andp.19083300113
- Einstein, A.; Laub, J. (1908), "Über die elektromagnetischen Grundgleichungen für bewegte Körper" (PDF), Annalen der Physik, 331 (8): 532–540, Bibcode:1908AnP...331..532E, doi:10.1002/andp.19083310806, archived from the original (PDF) on 2006-06-23
- Einstein, A.; Laub, J. (1908), "Über die im elektromagnetischen Felde auf ruhende Körper ausgeübten ponderomotorischen Kräfte" (PDF), Annalen der Physik, 331 (8): 541–550, Bibcode:1908AnP...331..541E, doi:10.1002/andp.19083310807, archived from the original (PDF) on 2006-06-23
- Laub, J. (1908), "Über die durch Röntgenstrahlen erzeugten sekundären Kathodenstrahlen", Annalen der Physik, 331 (9): 712–726, Bibcode:1908AnP...331..712L, doi:10.1002/andp.19083310903
- Einstein, A.; Laub, J. (1908), "Berichtigung zur Abhandlung: "Über die elektromagnetischen Grundgleichungen für bewegte Körper"", Annalen der Physik, 332 (11): 232, Bibcode:1908AnP...332..232E, doi:10.1002/andp.19083321115
- Laub, J. (1909), "Über den Einfluß der molekularen Bewegung auf die Dispersionserscheinungen in Gasen", Annalen der Physik, 333 (1): 131–141, Bibcode:1909AnP...333..131L, doi:10.1002/andp.19093330107
- Einstein, A.; Laub, J. (1909), "Bemerkungen zu unserer Arbeit: "Über die elektromagnetischen Grundgleichungen für bewegte Körper"" (PDF), Annalen der Physik, 333 (2): 445–447, Bibcode:1909AnP...333..445E, doi:10.1002/andp.19093330212, archived from the original (PDF) on 2006-06-23
- Laub, J. (1909), "Zur Theorie der Dispersion und Extinktion des Lichtes in leuchtenden Gasen und Dämpfen", Annalen der Physik, 334 (6): 94–110, Bibcode:1909AnP...334...94L, doi:10.1002/andp.19093340608
- Laub, J. (1910), "Über die experimentellen Grundlagen des Relativitätsprinzips", Jahrbuch der Radioaktivität und Elektronik, 7: 405–463
- Laub, J. (1915), "Über die Dispersionserscheinungen des Lichtes in beliebig bewegten Körpern", Annalen der Physik, 351 (5): 705–719, Bibcode:1915AnP...351..705L, doi:10.1002/andp.19153510509
- Laub, J. (1915), "Über die durch Röntgenstrahlen erzeugten Strahlen", Annalen der Physik, 351 (6): 785–808, Bibcode:1915AnP...351..785L, doi:10.1002/andp.19153510605

== See also ==
- History of special relativity
