= Carl T. Chase =

American physicist

- Born: 7 August 1902; Lewiston, Maine
- Died: 2 November 1987 (aged 85); Delaware County, Pennsylvania
- Known for: The confirmation of the Trouton–Noble experiment, which disconfirmed the luminiferous aether.
- Scientific career
- Fields: Physics

Carl Trueblood Chase (7 August 1902, Lewiston, Maine – 2 November 1987, Delaware County, Pennsylvania) was an American physicist, known for his 1926 confirmation of the Trouton–Noble experiment, which disconfirmed the luminiferous aether.

After graduating from Kennebunk High School, Chase attended Princeton University, where he graduated with B.S. in physics in 1924. He then became a graduate student at California Institute of Technology, where he worked at the Norman Bridge Laboratory of Physics and graduated with an master's degree in 1926. He received his Ph.D. from New York University (NYU), where he became an assistant professor of physics in 1934. During his career, he taught physics and astronomy at several colleges. In the 1940s he worked at the Franklin Institute.

R. T. Cox was Chase's thesis advisor at NYU. In 1959 Lee Grodzins pointed out that a 1928 experiment by R. T. Cox, C. G. McIlwraith, and B. Kurrelmeyer on double scattering of β rays from radium experimentally demonstrated parity violation, although the significance of the experiment was not appreciated until the late 1950s. In 1929 and 1930, Chase performed more precise experiments which confirmed the 1928 experiment.

He married Margaret Armstrong on 21 August 1927 in Maine. Upon his death he was survived by his widow, a son, and a granddaughter.

== Selected publications ==
- Chase, Carl T. (1926). "A Repetition of the Trouton-Noble Ether Drift Experiment" (PDF). Physical Review. 28 (2): 378–383. Bibcode:1926PhRv...28..378C. doi:10.1103/PhysRev.28.378.
- Chase, Carl T. (1927). "The Trouton-Noble Ether Drift Experiment". Physical Review. 30 (4): 516–519. Bibcode:1927PhRv...30..516C. doi:10.1103/PhysRev.30.516.
- Chase, Carl T. (1930). "The Scattering of Fast Electrons by Metals. II. Polarization by Double Scattering at Right Angles". Physical Review. 36 (6): 1060–1065. Bibcode:1930PhRv...36.1060C. doi:10.1103/PhysRev.36.1060.
- Chase, C. T.; Cox, R. T. (1940). "The Scattering of 50-Kilovolt Electrons by Aluminum". Physical Review. 58 (3): 243–251. Bibcode:1940PhRv...58..243C. doi:10.1103/PhysRev.58.243.
- Shull, C. G.; Chase, C. T.; Myers, F. E. (1943). "Electron Polarization". Physical Review. 63 (1–2): 29–37. Bibcode:1943PhRv...63...29S. doi:10.1103/PhysRev.63.29.
