= Richard Threlkeld Cox =

American physicist (1898–1991)

- Born: August 2, 1898
- Died: May 2, 1991 (aged 92)
- Education: Johns Hopkins University
- Known for: Cox's theorem
- Scientific career
- Institutions: New York University; Johns Hopkins University

Richard Threlkeld Cox (August 5, 1898 – May 2, 1991) was a professor of physics at Johns Hopkins University, known for Cox's theorem relating to the foundations of probability.

== Biography ==
He was born in Portland, Oregon, the son of attorney Lewis Cox and Elinor Cox. After Lewis Cox died, Elinor Cox married John Latané, who became a professor at Johns Hopkins University in 1913. In 1915 Richard enrolled at Johns Hopkins University to study physics, but his studies were cut short when he was drafted for World War I. He stayed in the US after being drafted and returned to Johns Hopkins University after the war, completing his BA in 1920. He earned his PhD in 1924; his dissertation was A Study of Pfund's Pressure Gauge.

He taught at New York University (NYU) from 1924 to 1943, before returning to Johns Hopkins to teach. He studied probability theory, the scattering of electrons, and the discharges of electric eels. Richard Cox's most important work was Cox's theorem.

His wife, Shelby Shackleford (1899 Halifax, Virginia – 1987), whom he married in 1926, was an accomplished artist and illustrated Electric Eel Calling, a book on electric eels.

He died on May 2, 1991. His doctoral students included Carl T. Chase and Clifford Shull.

== Cox and parity violation ==
According to T. D. Lee and C. N. Yang, parity violation implies that electrons produced by β decay should be longitudinally polarized. In 1959, Lee Grodzins indicated how a 1928 experiment by R. T. Cox, C. G. McIlwraith, and B. Kurrelmeyer on double scattering of β rays from radium confirms the polarization effect predicted by Lee and Yang. Carl T. Chase in 1929 and 1930 performed experiments confirming the 1928 experiment by Cox, McIlwraith, and Kurrelmeyer.

=== Louis Witten interview ===
Witten: ... I wanted to tell you something about Richard Cox. You mentioned Richard Cox. He did a lot of things, but he also did some experiments in condensed matter physics. He discovered an anomaly which wasn't consistent with physics. It couldn't be explained. It wasn't at all consistent, and he was told his experiment was wrong, and he knew that his experiment was right. So he published it, and it was an anomaly in the literature. Some years later, it was discovered that parity wasn't conserved, and his anomaly was non-parity. It's well known now by many people that his experiment was the first experiment that would have shown parity wasn't conserved if they had interpreted it correctly.
Rickles: But he didn't give that interpretation; he just thought there was something strange.
Witten: That's right. But he knew that his experiment was right and that people were trying to tell him that his experiment was wrong.

== Selected works ==
- Cox, R. T., "Of Inference and Inquiry - An Essay in Inductive Logic", In The Maximum Entropy Formalism, Ed. Levine and Tribus, M.I.T. Press, 1979.
- Cox, R. T. (1946). "Probability, Frequency and Reasonable Expectation" (PDF). American Journal of Physics. 14 (1): 1–10. Bibcode:1946AmJPh..14....1C. doi:10.1119/1.1990764.
- The Algebra of Probable Inference, Johns Hopkins University Press, Baltimore, MD, (1961).
