= Menyhért Palágyi =

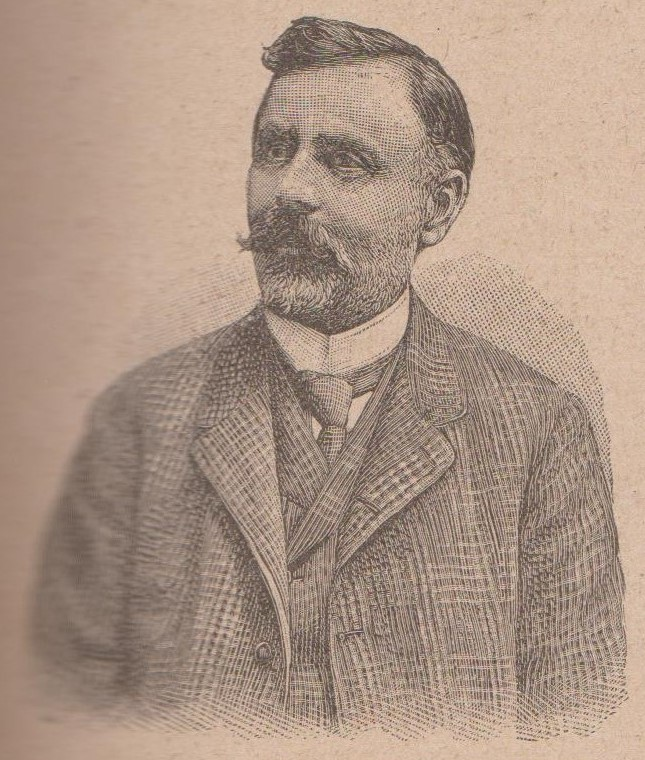

Menyhért Palágyi, in German Melchior or Meinhert Palagyi (16 or 26 December 1859 in Paks, Hungary – 14 July 1924 in Darmstadt, Germany) was a Hungarian philosopher, mathematician, and physicist of Jewish descent (his original name was Silberstein, it was changed in 1895). He was the elder brother of the Hungarian poet Ludwig Palágyi.

Palágyi presented new theory of space and time (1901), which had a certain similarity with the space-time formalism of Henri Poincaré and Hermann Minkowski in the context of special relativity theory (e.g. Palagyi used the imaginary time coordinate it as the fourth dimension of "space-time"). However, his philosophy had little in common with the physics of relativity theory. Therefore, in 1914 he expressed his criticism of the theories of Albert Einstein and Hermann Minkowski. However, in a subsequent paper Max Born showed that Palagyi's criticism was misguided.

Palagyi's concept of vital fantasy makes him an ancestor of cybernetic anthropology. His theory of virtual movement forms the basis for different movement-therapeutic concepts. Palágyi also engaged in controversy with Edmund Husserl.

== Works ==
- Madách Imre élete és költészete (I. Madachs Leben u. Dichtungen. Mit Portr. Von M. P.). Budapest: Athenaeum, 1900.
- Neue Theorie des Raumes und der Zeit. Die Grundbegriffe einer Metageometrie. Unveränd. reprogr. Nachdr. d. Ausg. Leipzig, Engelmanns Verlag, 1901. Darmstadt: Wiss. Buchges., 1967.
- Kant und Bolzano: Eine krit. Parallele. Halle a.S.: M. Niemeyer, 1902.
- Der Streit der Psychologisten und Formalisten in der modernen Logik. Leipzig: W. Engelmann, 1902.
- Die Relativitätstheorie in der modernen Physik. Vortrag gehalten auf dem 85. Naturforschertag in Wien. Berlin: G. Reimer, 1914.
- Zur Weltmechanik. Beiträge zur Metaphysik der Physik. Mit einem Geleitwort von Ernst Gehrcke. Leipzig. Verlag von Johann Ambrosius Barth. 1925
- Naturphilosophische Vorlesungen: Über die Grundprobleme des Bewusstseins und des Lebens. Leipzig: Johann Ambrosius Barth 1924.
- Wahrnehmungslehre. Mit e. Einführung v. Dr. Ludwig Klages. Leipzig: Barth, 1925.

== See also ==
- History of special relativity
