= Kurd von Mosengeil =

German physicist

Kurd Friedrich Rudolf von Mosengeil, also Curd Friedrich Rudolf von Mosengeil (* 7 March 1884 in Bonn; † 5 September 1906 at Wildgall in Rieserfernergruppe), was a German physicist.

Kurd von Mosengeil was a student of Max Planck. In 1905, the latter became the most prominent early advocate of the theory of special relativity of Albert Einstein. In the subsequent years, Planck published several works, in which he explained further consequences of Einstein's theory. He conveyed his enthusiasm to his assistant Max von Laue and his student Kurd of Mosengeil, who became the first physicists to habilitate and graduate, respectively, in relativity-related subjects.

Tragically, Kurd von Mosengeil died in a mountaineering accident in Tyrol in September 1906, as he was completing his doctoral dissertation. Planck and Wilhelm Wien edited his draft for publication in the Annalen der Physik in 1907. The resulting posthumous paper (Theorie der stationären Strahlung in einem gleichförmig bewegten Hohlraum, en:Theory of stationary radiation in a uniformly moving cavity) contains the correct relativistic expression for the temperature of a moving body among other equations of relativistic thermodynamics and a statement of the mass-energy equivalence inspired by the work of Friedrich Hasenöhrl (1904). Planck vouched personally for the scientific content of von Mosengeil's dissertation and believed in its lasting value. Von Mosengeil's results help break new ground in further researches by Planck (1907) and Einstein (1908).
