= Science and Hypothesis =

Book by Henri Poincaré

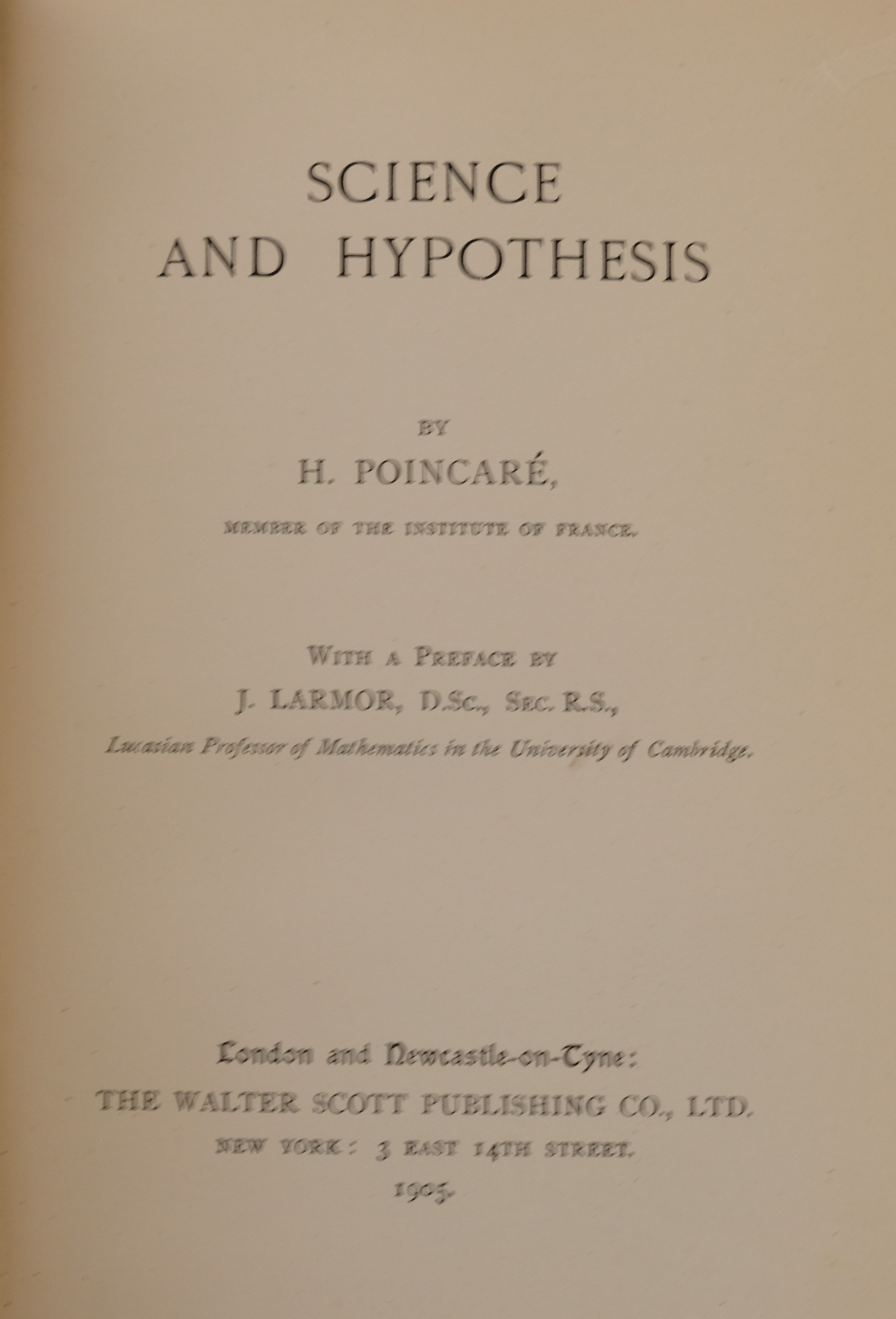
- Title page of 1905 edition, with preface by Joseph Larmor
- Original title: La Science et l'Hypothèse
- Language: French
- Subject: Science
- Published: 1902
- Publication place: France
- Media type: Print
- Text: Science and Hypothesis at Wikisource

Science and Hypothesis (French: La Science et l'Hypothèse) is a book by French mathematician Henri Poincaré, first published in 1902. Aimed at a non-specialist readership, it deals with mathematics, space, physics and nature. It puts forward the theses that absolute truth in science is unattainable, and that many commonly held beliefs of scientists are held as convenient conventions rather than because they are more valid than the alternatives.

In this book, Poincaré describes open scientific questions regarding the photo-electric effect, Brownian motion, and the relativity of physical laws in space. Reading this book inspired Albert Einstein's subsequent Annus Mirabilis papers published in 1905.

This book was put into the Encyclopedia Britannica series Great Books of the Western World. A new translation was published in November 2017.

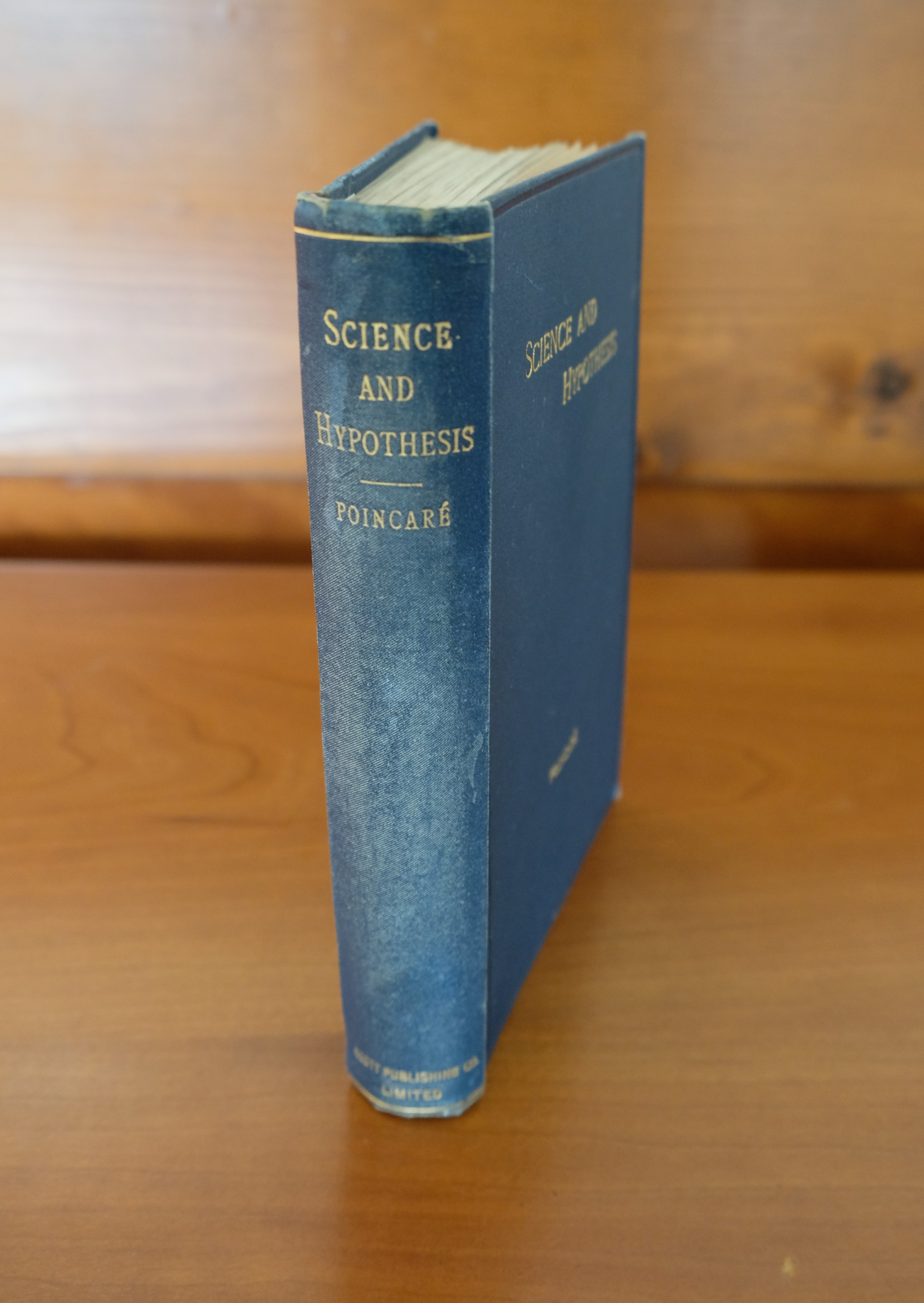
Science and hypothesis (1905)

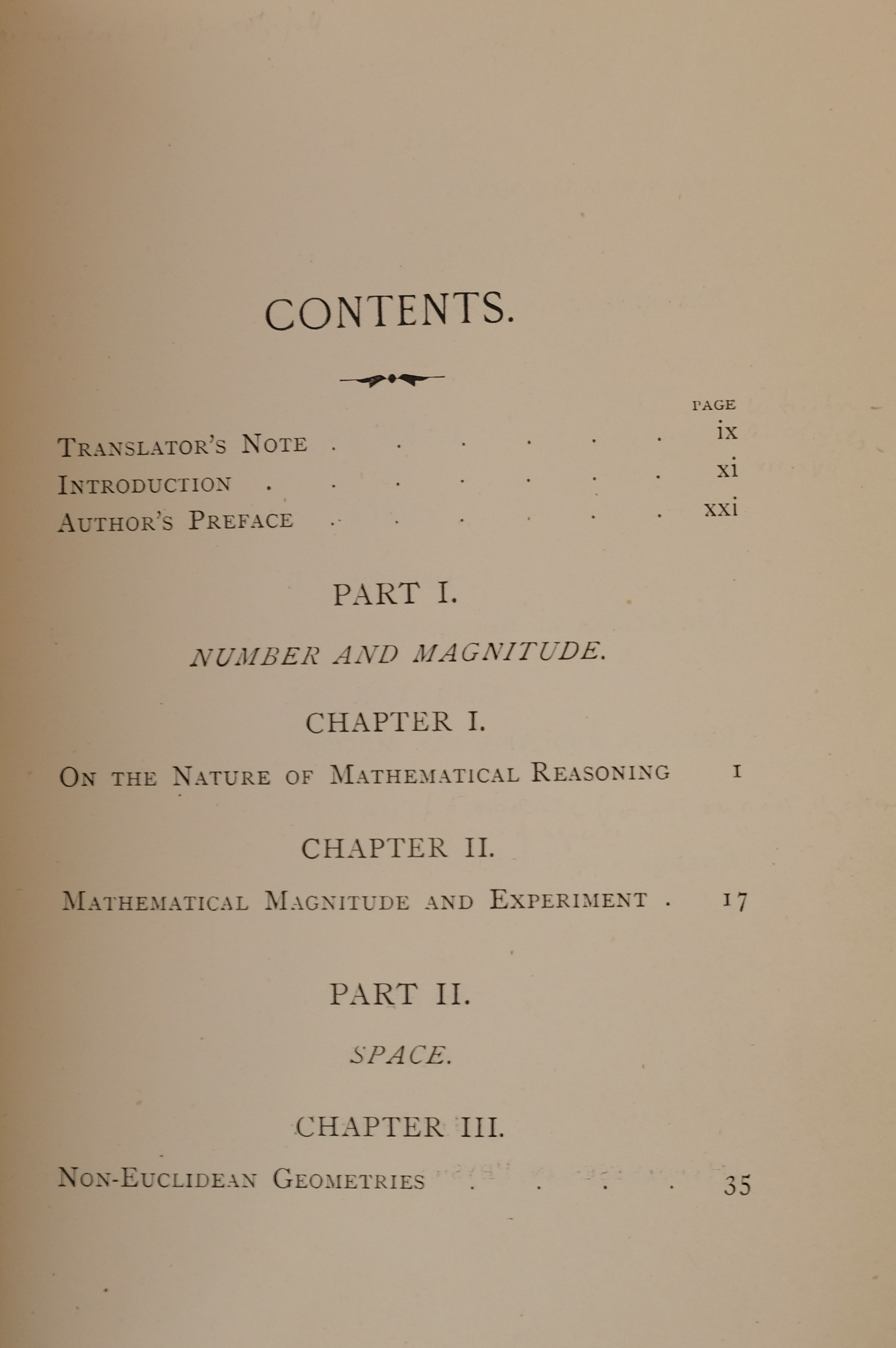
Table of contents to Science and hypothesis (1905)

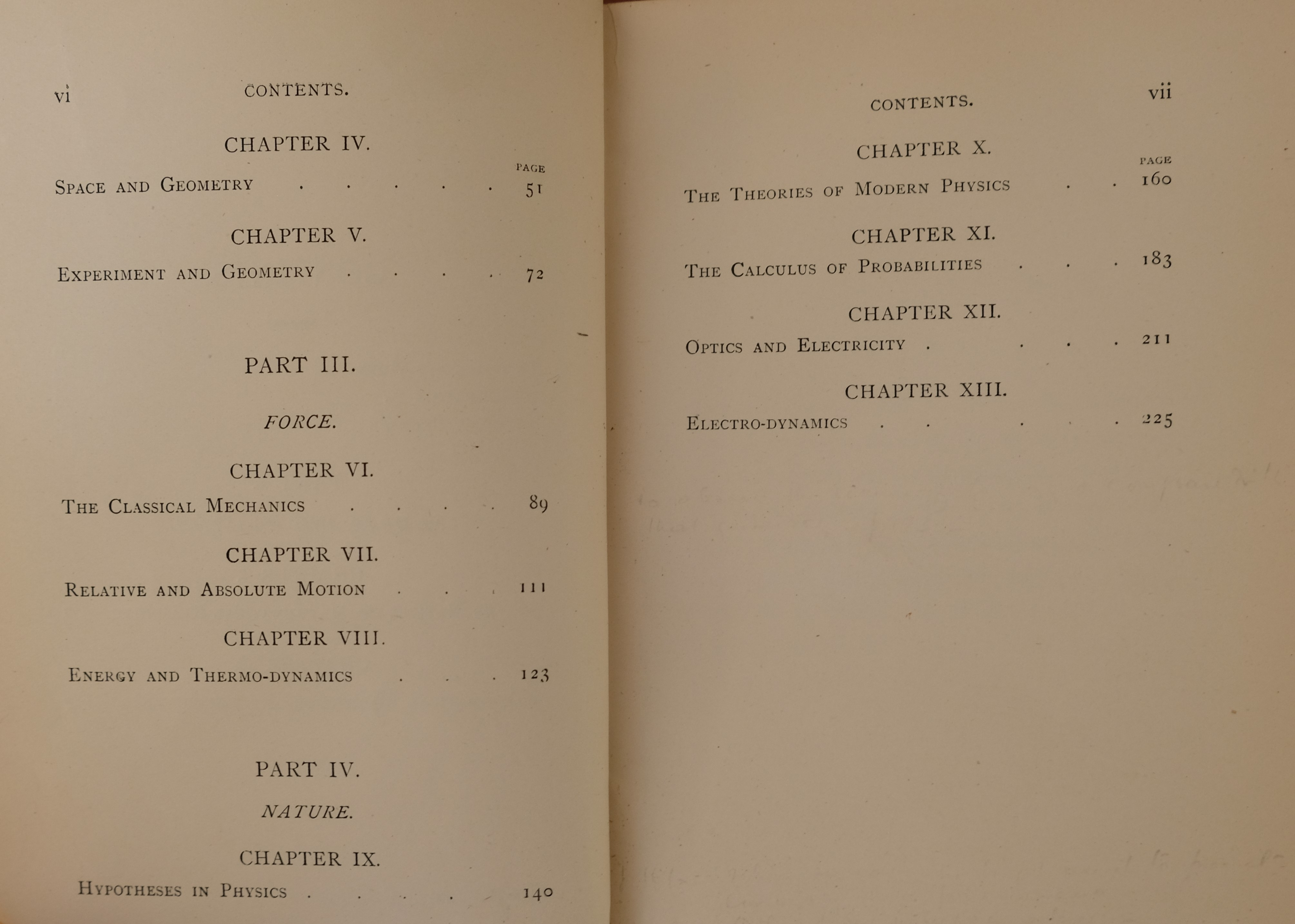
Table of contents to Science and hypothesis (1905)

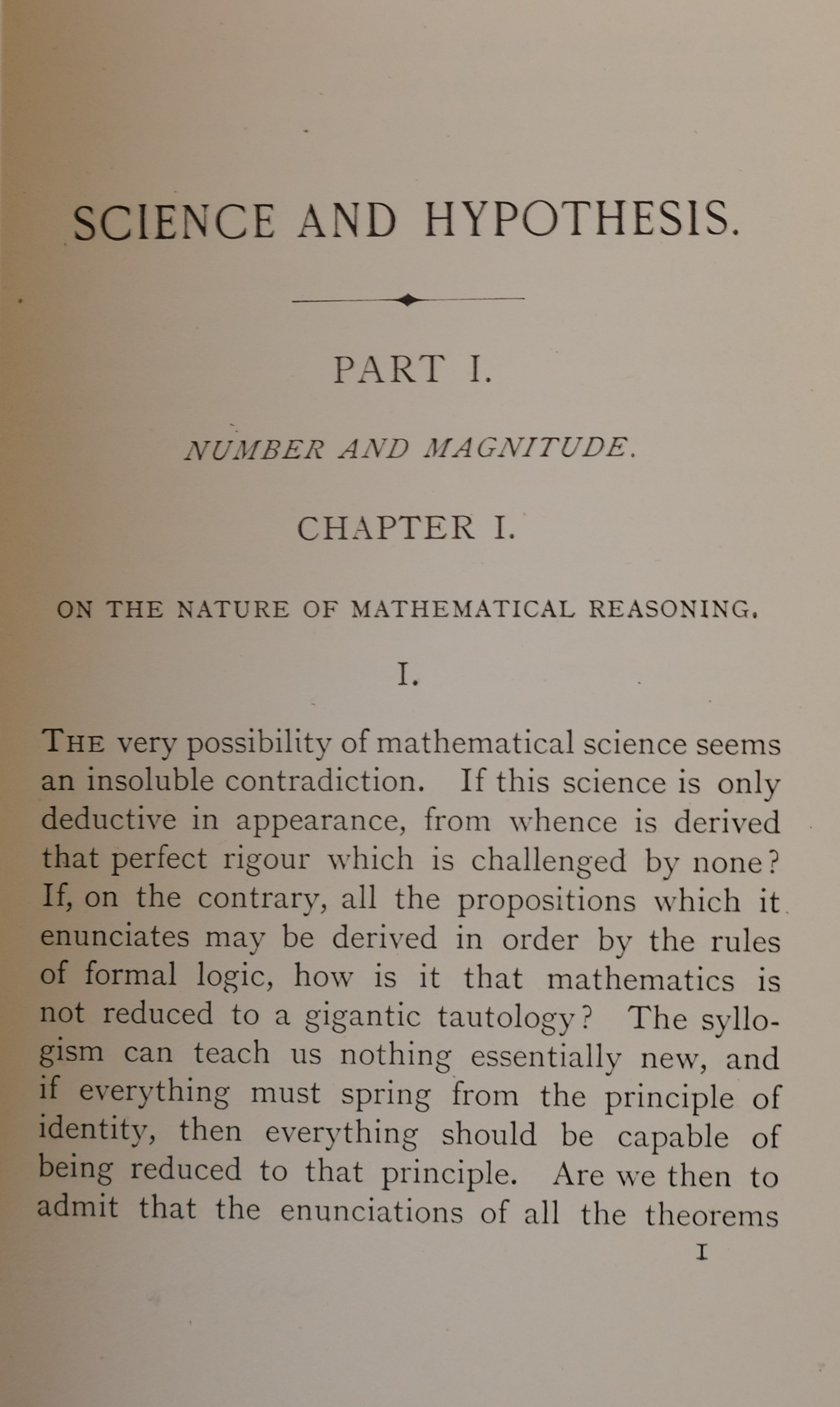
First page of Science and hypothesis (1905)
