= Lajos Palágyi =

Hungarian poet (1866–1933)

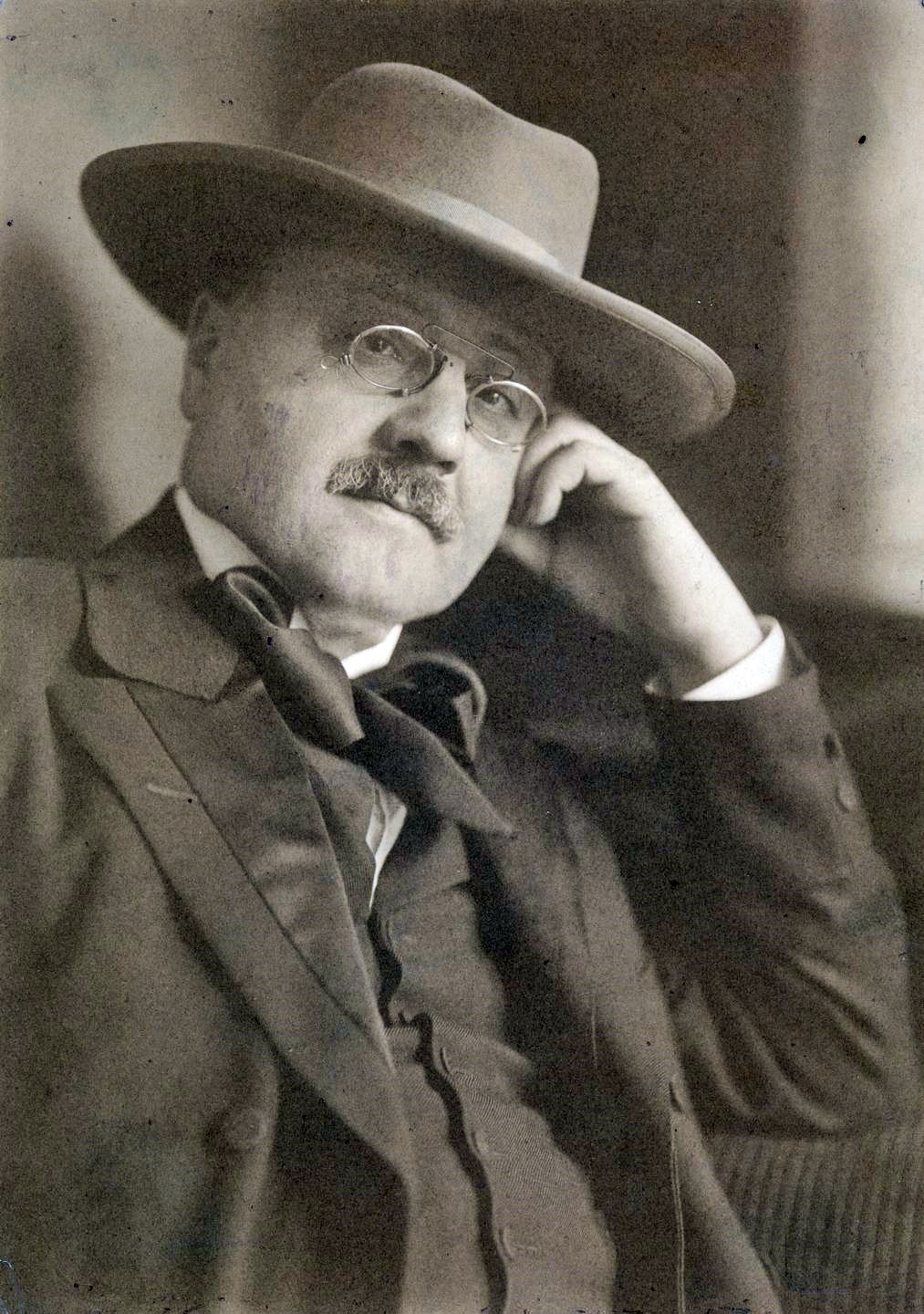
- Born: Lázár Silberstein; 15 April 1866; Becse
- Died: 7 March 1933 (aged 66); Budapest
- Resting place: Farkasrét Jewish cemetery
- Spouse: Zili Schlesinger
- Writing career
- Language: Hungarian

Lajos Palágyi (15 April 1866 – 7 March 1933), born Lázár Silberstein (Yiddish: לייזר זילבערשטיין), was a Hungarian poet, journalist, and educator. His poems often dealt with Jewish themes.

== Biography ==
Born in Becse to Jewish parents Rozália (Reizel, née Seelenfreund) and Mór (Moshe) Silberstein, he was educated privately by his father, a former public school-teacher, and by his elder brother Menachem (later known as Melchior Palágyi). He began to write at the age of thirteen, his first poem appearing in 1879 in Emil Ábrányi Magyar Népbarát. He soon became a contributor to the literary periodicals Vasárnapi Ujság, Országvilág, Magyar Szalon, Fővárosi Lapok, and Képes Családi Lapok, and in 1890 he won the prize of 100 ducats offered by the Petőfi Society for a poem to be recited at the monument of the Thirteen Martyrs. In recognition of his services to the Hungarian language he was appointed professor at the State Teachers' Seminary for women at Budapest.

Palagyi was involved in the effort which resulted in the official recognition of Judaism in Hungary in 1895. Following the 1918–1920 Hungarian revolution, he was expelled from the Petőfi Society and deprived of his pension because of his past associations with socialism. He lived a reclusive life in his final years.

== Partial bibliography ==
- Humoros költemények [Humorous Poems]. Esztergom, 1888.
- Küzdelmes évek [Years of Struggle]. Budapest. 1890.
- Komor napok [Bleak Days]. Budapest. 1890.
- Magányos úton [On the Lonely Road]. Budapest. 1893.
- Az ifjú szerzetes [The Young Monk]. Budapest. 1894. A philosophical poem.
- Nemzeti dalok [National Songs]. Budapest. 1895.
- Bibliai emlékek [Biblical Reminiscences]. Budapest. 1896.
- A rabszolga [The Slave]. Budapest. 1902. A tragedy which won the prize of the Hungarian Academy.
- Az anyaföld [Mother Earth]. Budapest. 1921.
