= Hittorf (disambiguation) =

Hittorf or Hittorff is a German surname. It may refer to:

- Jacques Ignace Hittorff, 1792–1867, German-born French architect
- Johann Wilhelm Hittorf, 1824–1914, German physicist

== See also ==
- Crookes-Hittorf tube, an experimental apparatus in physics
- Hittorf's phosphorus, a variety of phosphorus
