= John Turner MacGregor-Morris =

Professor of electrical engineering

John Turner MacGregor-Morris (1872-1959) was a professor of electrical engineering at Queen Mary University of London. His papers are held by the Queen Mary Archives.

== Selected publications ==
- Cathode Ray Oscillography. 1936. (with J.A. Henley)
- Sir Ambrose Fleming and the Birth of the Valve. 1954.
