= Cathode ray =

Beam of electrons observed in vacuum tubes

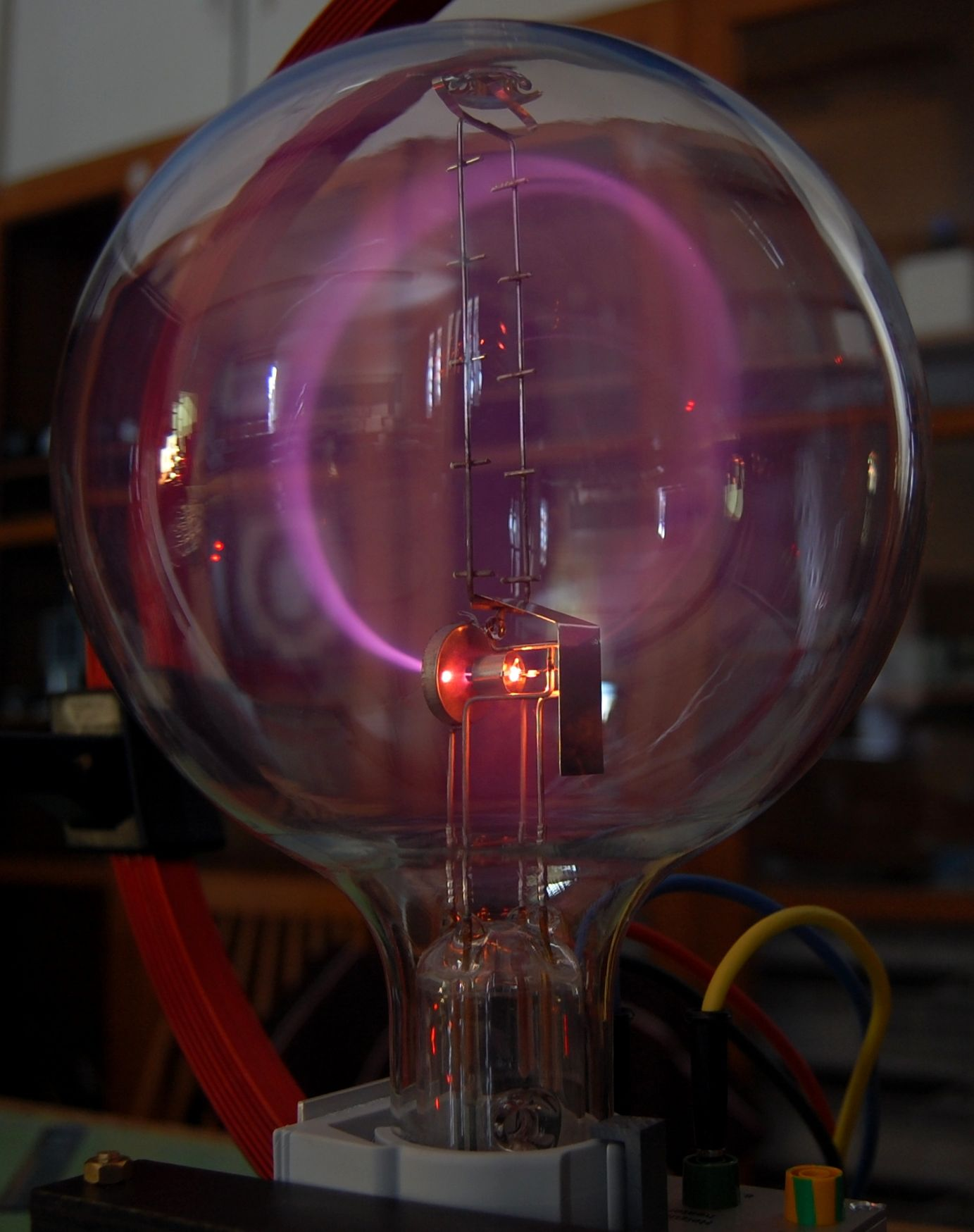
A beam of cathode rays in a vacuum tube bent into a circle by a magnetic field generated by a Helmholtz coil. Cathode rays are normally invisible; in this demonstration Teltron tube, enough gas has been left in the tube for the gas atoms to luminesce when struck by the fast-moving electrons.

Cathode rays are streams of electrons observed in discharge tubes. If an evacuated glass tube is equipped with two electrodes and a voltage is applied, glass behind the positive electrode is observed to glow, due to electrons emitted from the cathode (the electrode connected to the negative terminal of the voltage supply). They were first observed in 1859 by German physicist Julius Plücker and Johann Wilhelm Hittorf, and were named in 1876 by Eugen Goldstein Kathodenstrahlen, or cathode rays. In 1897, British physicist J. J. Thomson showed that cathode rays were composed of a previously unknown negatively charged particle, which was later named the electron. Cathode ray tubes (CRTs) use a focused beam of electrons deflected by electric or magnetic fields to render an image.

== Description ==
A diagram showing a Crookes tube connected to a high voltage supply. The metal Maltese cross in the tube, with no external connection to the circuit, casts a shadow on the glowing wall.

Cathode rays are so named because they are emitted by the negative electrode, or cathode, in a vacuum tube. To release electrons into the tube, they first must be detached from the atoms of the cathode. In the early experimental cold cathode vacuum tubes in which cathode rays were discovered, called Crookes tubes, this was done by using a high electrical potential of thousands of volts between the anode and the cathode to ionize the residual gas atoms in the tube. The positive ions were accelerated by the electric field toward the cathode, and when they collided with it they knocked electrons out of its surface; these were the cathode rays. Modern vacuum tubes use thermionic emission, in which the cathode is made of a thin wire filament which is heated by a separate electric current passing through it. The heat provides enough energy for electrons to escape from the surface of the filament, into the evacuated space of the tube.

Since the electrons have a negative charge, they are repelled by the negative cathode and attracted to the positive anode. They travel in parallel lines through the empty tube. The voltage applied between the electrodes accelerates these low mass particles to high velocities. Cathode rays are invisible, but their presence was first detected in these Crookes tubes when they struck the glass wall of the tube, exciting the atoms of the glass and causing them to emit light, a glow called fluorescence. Researchers noticed that objects placed in the tube in front of the cathode could cast a shadow on the glowing wall, and realized that something must be traveling in straight lines from the cathode. After the electrons strike the back of the tube they make their way to the anode, then travel through the anode wire through the power supply and back through the cathode wire to the cathode, so cathode rays carry electric current through the tube.

The current in a beam of cathode rays through a vacuum tube can be controlled by passing it through a metal screen of wires (a grid) between cathode and anode, to which a small negative voltage is applied. The electric field of the wires deflects some of the electrons, preventing them from reaching the anode. The amount of current that gets through to the anode depends on the voltage on the grid. Thus, a small voltage on the grid can be made to control a much larger voltage on the anode. This is the principle used in vacuum tubes to amplify electrical signals. The triode vacuum tube developed between 1907 and 1914 was the first electronic device that could amplify, and is still used in some applications such as radio transmitters. High speed beams of cathode rays can also be steered and manipulated by electric fields created by additional metal plates in the tube to which voltage is applied, or magnetic fields created by coils of wire (electromagnets). These are used in cathode ray tubes, found in televisions and computer monitors, and in electron microscopes.

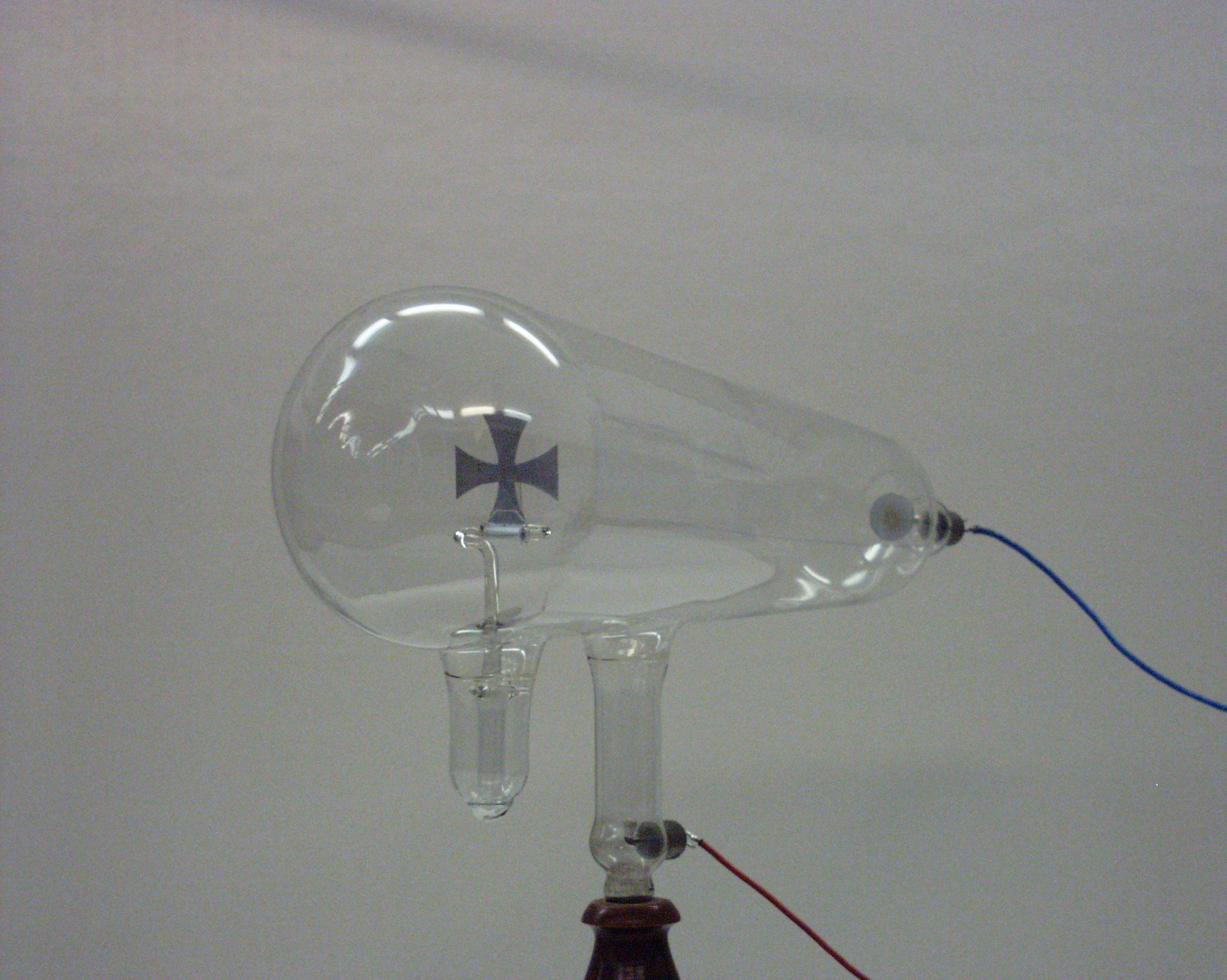
Crookes tube. The cathode (negative terminal) is on the right. The anode (positive terminal) is in the base of the tube at bottom.

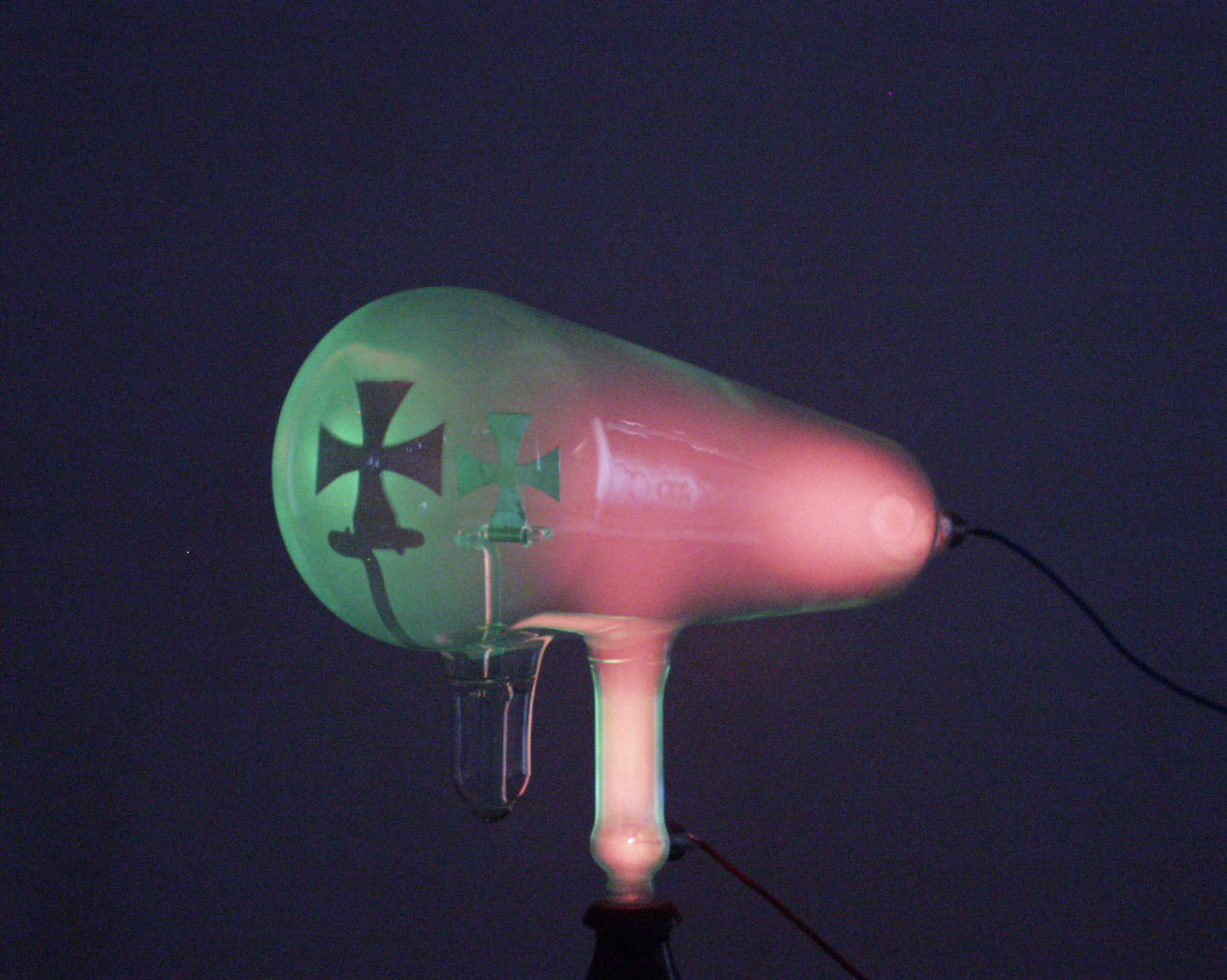
Cathode rays travel from the cathode at the rear of the tube, striking the glass front, making it glow green by fluorescence. A metal cross in the tube casts a shadow, demonstrating that the rays travel in straight lines.

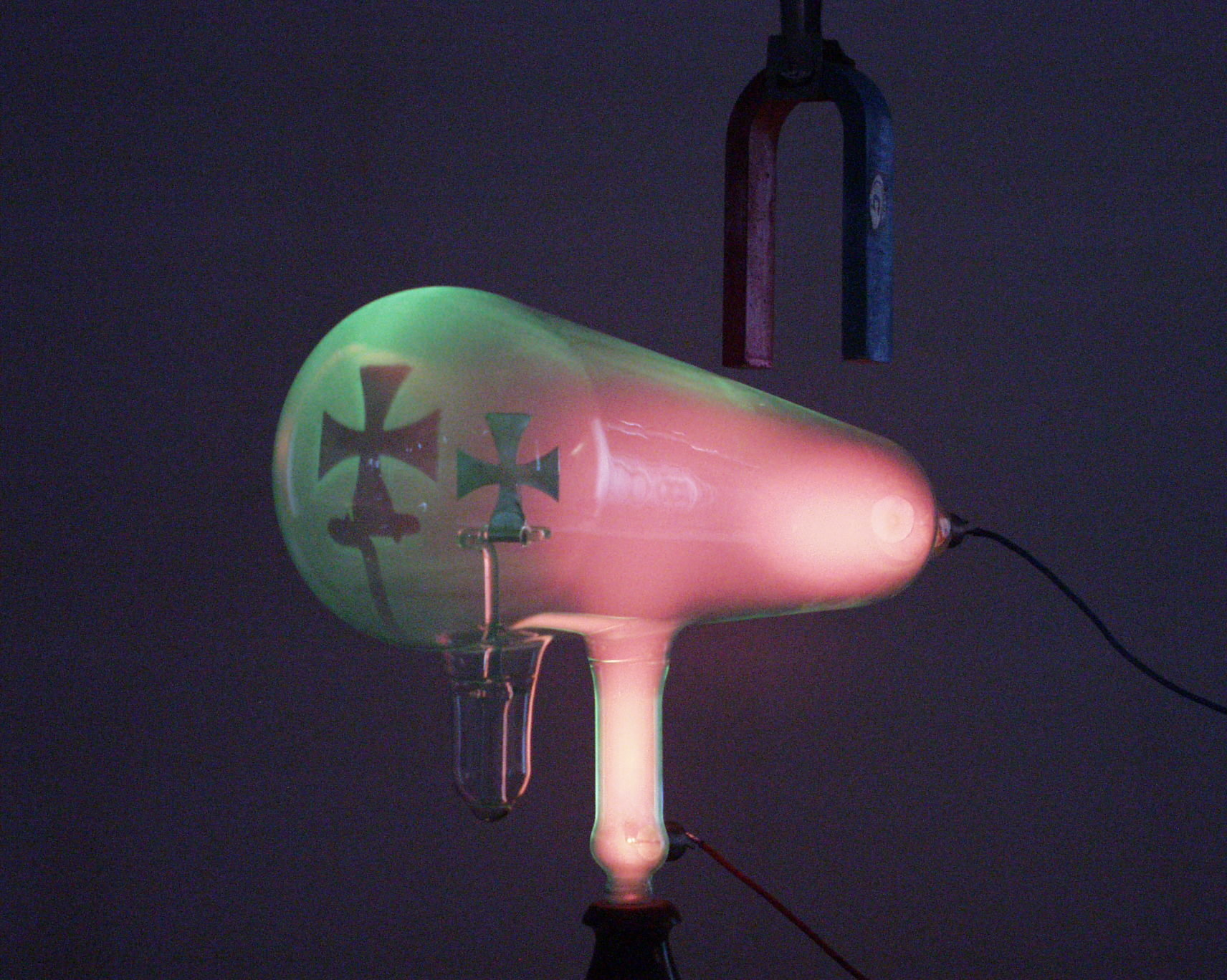
A magnet creates a horizontal magnetic field through the neck of the tube, bending the rays up, so the green spot is higher.

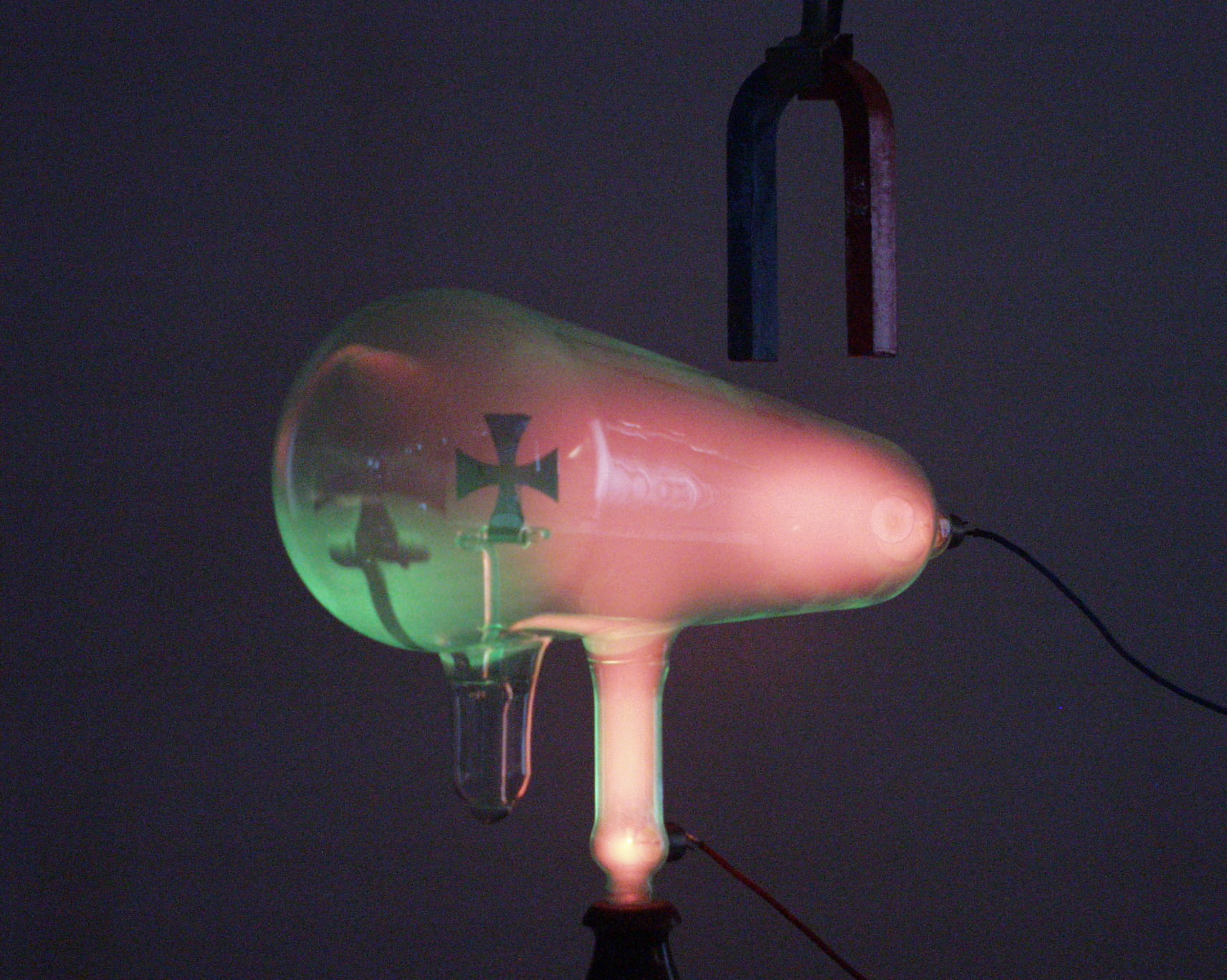
When the magnet is reversed, it bends the rays down, so the green spot is lower. The pink glow is caused by cathode rays striking residual gas atoms in the tube.

== History ==
After the invention of the vacuum pump in 1654 by Otto von Guericke, physicists began to experiment with passing high voltage electricity through rarefied air. In 1705, it was noted that electrostatic generator sparks travel a longer distance through low pressure air than through atmospheric pressure air.

=== Gas discharge tubes ===
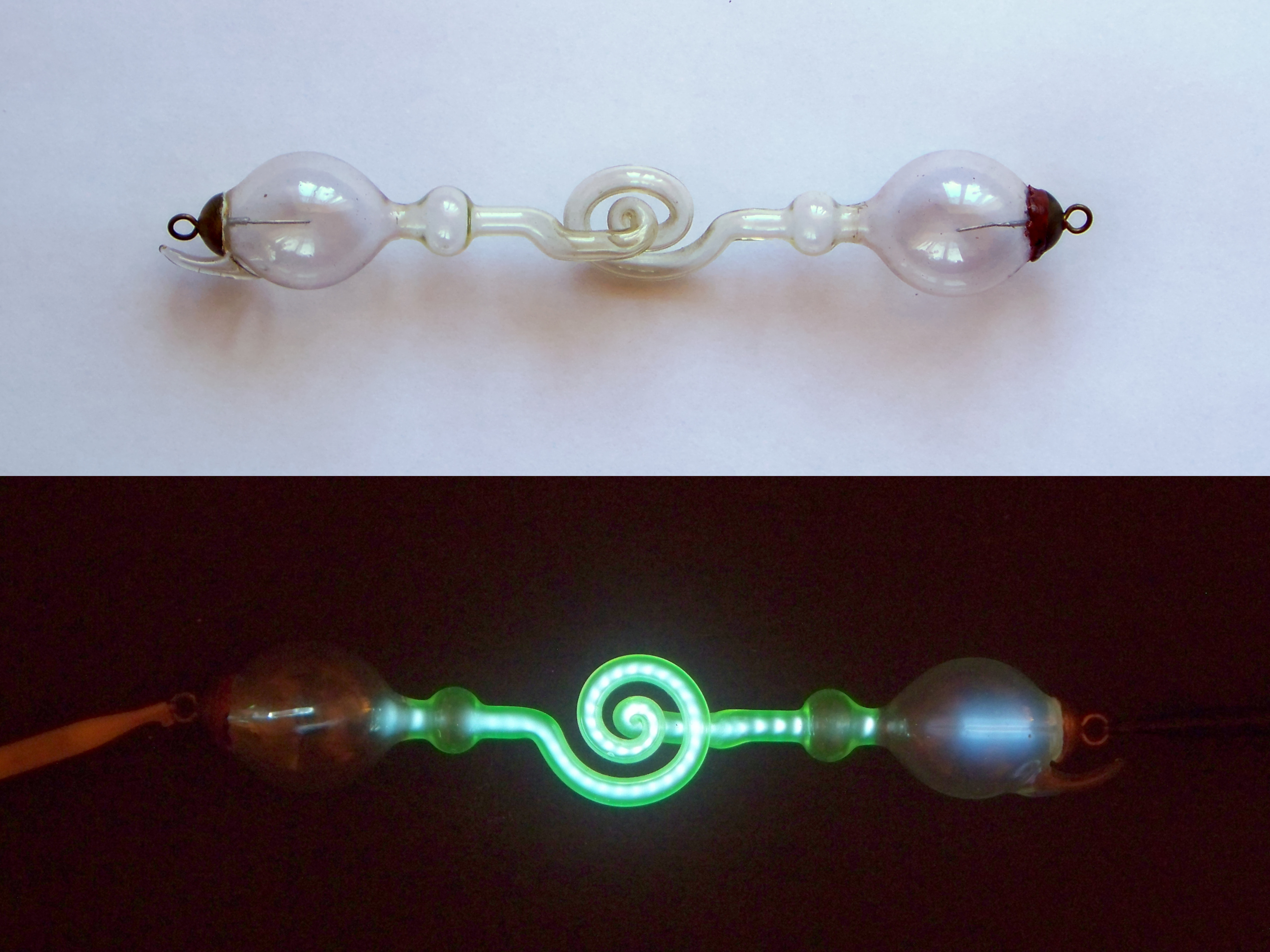
Geissler tube, in daylight (above) and in the dark, illuminated by its own light

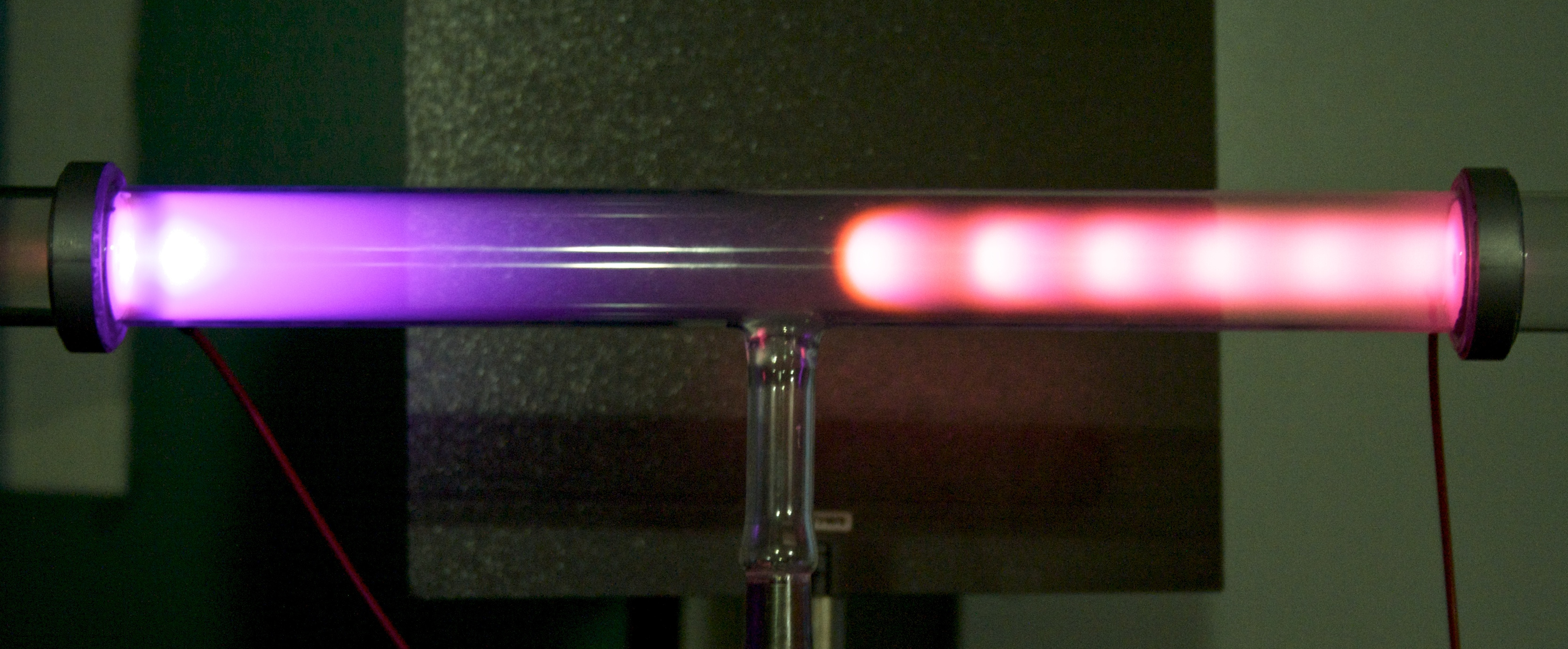
Glow discharge in a low-pressure tube caused by electric current.

In 1838, Michael Faraday applied a high voltage between two metal electrodes at either end of a glass tube that had been partially evacuated of air, and noticed a strange light arc with its beginning at the cathode (negative electrode) and its end at the anode (positive electrode). In 1857, German physicist and glassblower Heinrich Geissler sucked even more air out with an improved pump, to a pressure of around 10^{−3} atm and found that, instead of an arc, a glow filled the tube. The voltage applied between the two electrodes of the tubes, generated by an induction coil, was anywhere between a few kilovolts and 100 kV. These were called Geissler tubes, similar to today's neon signs.

The explanation of these effects was that the high voltage accelerated free electrons and electrically charged atoms (ions) naturally present in the air of the tube. At low pressure, there was enough space between the gas atoms that the electrons could accelerate to high enough speeds that when they struck an atom they knocked electrons off of it, creating more positive ions and free electrons, which went on to create more ions and electrons in a chain reaction, known as a glow discharge. The positive ions were attracted to the cathode and when they struck it knocked more electrons out of it, which were attracted toward the anode. Thus the ionized air was electrically conductive and an electric current flowed through the tube.

Geissler tubes had enough air in them that the electrons could only travel a tiny distance before colliding with an atom. The electrons in these tubes moved in a slow diffusion process, never gaining much speed, so these tubes didn't produce cathode rays. Instead, they produced a colorful glow discharge (as in a modern neon light), caused when the electrons struck gas atoms, exciting their orbital electrons to higher energy levels. The electrons released this energy as light. This process is called fluorescence.

=== Cathode rays ===
A beam of cathode rays being bent by a magnetic field. Cathode rays are normally invisible; the path of this beam is revealed by having it strike a card with a fluorescent coating

By the 1870s, British physicist William Crookes and others were able to evacuate tubes to a lower pressure, below 10^{−6} atm. These were called Crookes tubes. Faraday had been the first to notice a dark space just in front of the cathode, where there was no luminescence. This came to be called the "cathode dark space", "Faraday dark space" or "Crookes dark space". Crookes found that as he pumped more air out of the tubes, the Faraday dark space spread down the tube from the cathode toward the anode, until the tube was totally dark. But at the anode (positive) end of the tube, the glass of the tube itself began to glow.

What was happening was that as more air was pumped from the tube, the electrons that were knocked out of the cathode when positive ions struck it could travel farther, on average, before they struck a gas atom. By the time the tube was dark, most of the electrons could travel in straight lines from the cathode to the anode without a collision. With no obstructions, these low mass particles were accelerated to high velocities by the voltage between the electrodes. These were the cathode rays.

When they reached the anode end of the tube, they were traveling so fast that, although they were attracted to it, they often flew past the anode and struck the back wall of the tube. When they struck atoms in the glass wall, they excited their orbital electrons to higher energy levels. When the electrons returned to their original energy level, they released the energy as light, causing the glass to fluoresce, usually a greenish or bluish color. Later researchers painted the inside back wall with fluorescent chemicals such as zinc sulfide, to make the glow more visible.

Cathode rays themselves are invisible, but this accidental fluorescence allowed researchers to notice that objects in the tube in front of the cathode, such as the anode, cast sharp-edged shadows on the glowing back wall. In 1869, German physicist Johann Hittorf was first to realize that something must be traveling in straight lines from the cathode to cast the shadows. Eugen Goldstein named them cathode rays (German Kathodenstrahlen).

=== Discovery of the electron ===
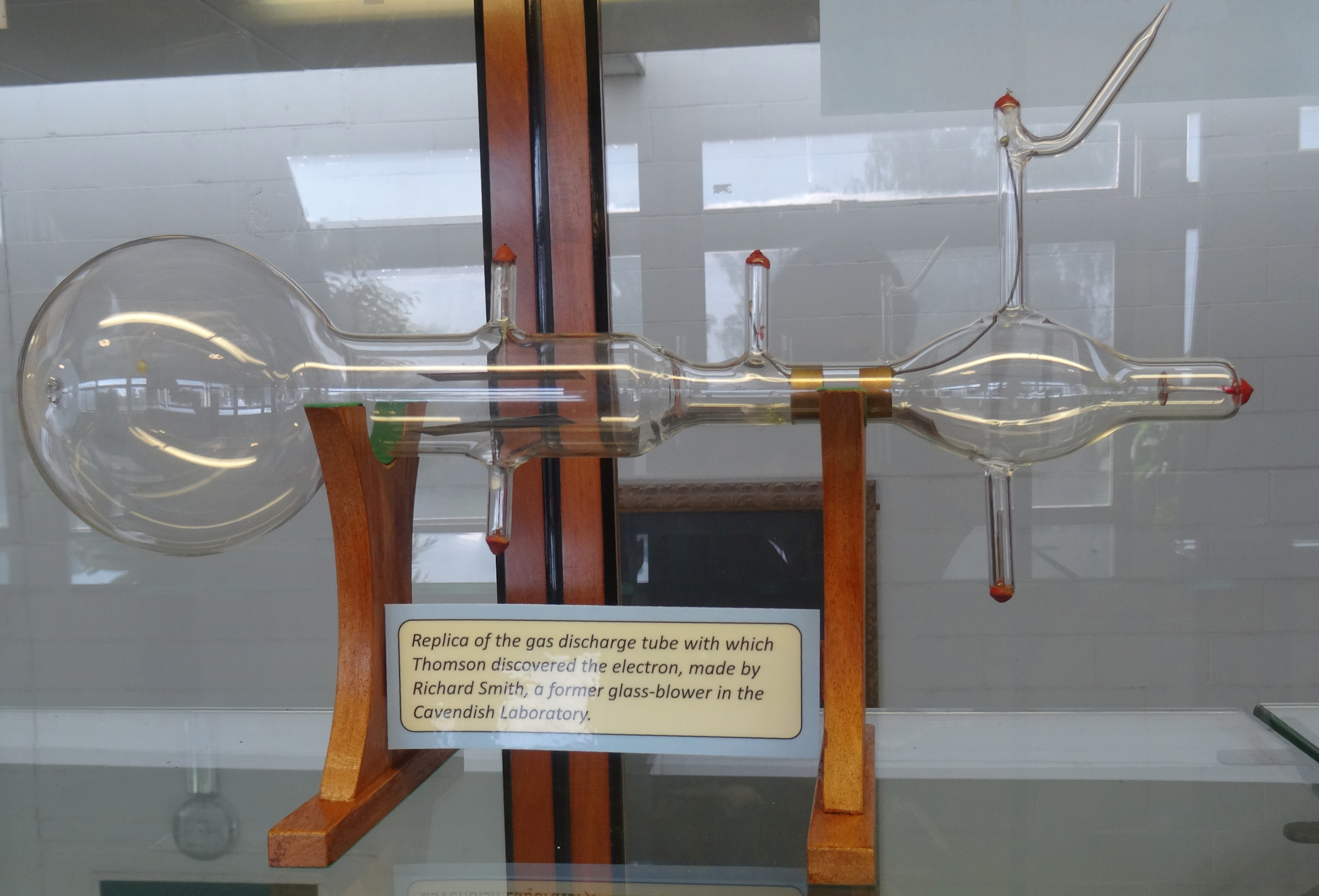
A replica of J. J. Thomson's electric deflection tube, in which he showed that a beam of cathode rays was bent by an electric field like matter particles. The cathode is on R. The electron beam is accelerated passing through the cylindrical high voltage anode (center), bent by a voltage on the deflection plates (center L), and strikes the back wall of the tube causing a luminous glow.

At this time, atoms were the smallest particles known, and were believed to be indivisible. What carried electric currents was a mystery. During the last quarter of the 19th century, many historic experiments were done with Crookes tubes to determine what cathode rays were. There were two theories. Crookes and Arthur Schuster believed they were particles of "radiant matter," that is, electrically charged atoms. German scientists Eilhard Wiedemann, Heinrich Hertz and Goldstein believed they were "aether waves", some new form of electromagnetic radiation, and were separate from what carried the electric current through the tube.

The debate was resolved in 1897 when J. J. Thomson measured the mass of cathode rays, showing they were made of particles, but were around 1800 times lighter than the lightest atom, hydrogen. Therefore, they were not atoms, but a new particle, the first subatomic particle to be discovered, which he originally called "corpuscle" but was later named electron, after particles postulated by George Johnstone Stoney in 1874. He also showed they were identical with particles given off by photoelectric and radioactive materials. It was quickly recognized that they are the particles that carry electric currents in metal wires, and carry the negative electric charge of the atom.

Thomson was given the 1906 Nobel Prize in Physics for this work. Philipp Lenard also contributed a great deal to cathode-ray theory, winning the Nobel Prize in 1905 for his research on cathode rays and their properties.

=== Vacuum tubes ===
The gas ionization (or cold cathode) method of producing cathode rays used in Crookes tubes was unreliable, because it depended on the pressure of the residual air in the tube. Over time, the air was absorbed by the walls of the tube, and it stopped working.

A more reliable and controllable method of producing cathode rays was investigated by Hittorf and Goldstein, and rediscovered by Thomas Edison in 1880. A cathode made of a wire filament heated red hot by a separate current passing through it would release electrons into the tube by a process called thermionic emission. The first true electronic vacuum tubes, invented in 1904 by John Ambrose Fleming, used this hot cathode technique, and they superseded Crookes tubes. These tubes didn't need gas in them to work, so they were evacuated to a lower pressure, around 10^{−9} atm (10^{−4} Pa). The ionization method of creating cathode rays used in Crookes tubes is today only used in a few specialized gas discharge tubes such as krytrons.

In 1906, Lee De Forest found that a small voltage on a grid of metal wires between the cathode and anode could control a current in a beam of cathode rays passing through a vacuum tube. His invention, called the triode, was the first device that could amplify electric signals, and revolutionized electrical technology, creating the new field of electronics. Vacuum tubes made radio and television broadcasting possible, as well as radar, talking movies, audio recording, and long-distance telephone service, and were the foundation of consumer electronic devices until the 1960s, when the transistor brought the era of vacuum tubes to a close.

Cathode rays are now usually called electron beams. The technology of manipulating electron beams pioneered in these early tubes was applied practically in the design of vacuum tubes, particularly in the invention of the cathode ray tube (CRT) by Ferdinand Braun in 1897, which was used in television sets and oscilloscopes. Today, electron beams are employed in sophisticated devices such as electron microscopes, electron beam lithography and particle accelerators.

== Properties ==
During the last quarter of the 19th century dozens of historic experiments were conducted to try to find out what cathode rays were. There were two theories: British scientists Crookes and Cromwell Varley believed they were particles of 'radiant matter', that is, electrically charged atoms. German researchers E. Wiedemann, Heinrich Hertz, and Eugen Goldstein believed they were 'aether vibrations', some new form of electromagnetic waves, and were separate from what carried the current through the tube. The debate continued until J. J. Thomson measured cathode ray’s mass, proving they were a previously unknown negatively charged particle in an atom, the first subatomic particle, which he called a 'corpuscle' but was later renamed the 'electron'.

=== Straight line motion ===
Julius Plücker in 1858/59 built a tube with an anode shaped like a Maltese Cross facing the cathode. It was hinged, so it could fold down against the floor of the tube. When the tube was turned on, the cathode rays cast a sharp cross-shaped shadow on the fluorescence on the back face of the tube, showing that the rays moved in straight lines. This fluorescence was used as an argument that cathode rays were electromagnetic waves, since the only thing known to cause fluorescence at the time was ultraviolet light. After a while the fluorescence would get 'tired' and the glow would decrease. If the cross was folded down out of the path of the rays, it no longer cast a shadow, and the previously shadowed area would fluoresce more strongly than the area around it.

=== Perpendicular emission ===
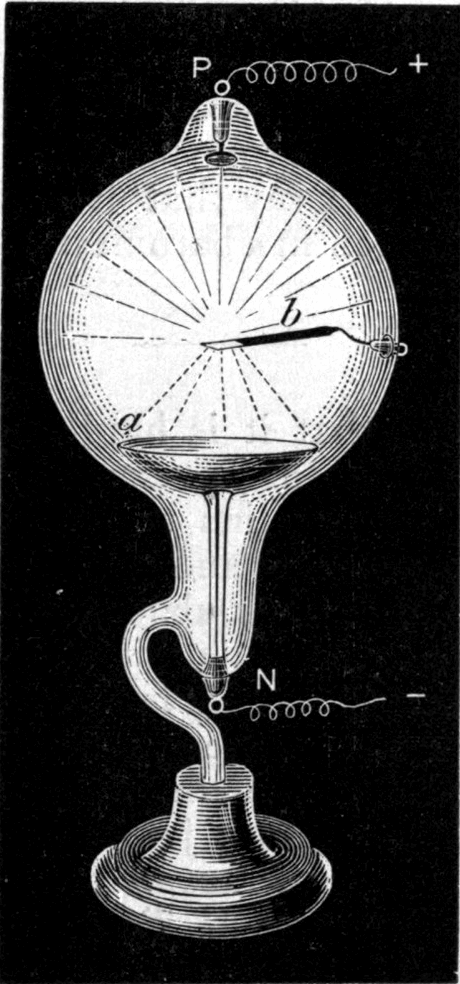
Crookes tube with concave cathode

Eugen Goldstein in 1876 found that cathode rays were always emitted perpendicular to the cathode's surface. If the cathode was a flat plate, the rays were shot out in straight lines perpendicular to the plane of the plate. This was evidence that they were particles, because a luminous object, like a red hot metal plate, emits light in all directions, while a charged particle will be repelled by the cathode in a perpendicular direction. Cathode rays heat matter which they strike. If the electrode was made in the form of a concave spherical dish, the cathode rays would be focused to a spot in front of the dish. This could be used to heat samples to a high temperature.

=== Electrostatic deflection ===
Cathode rays path can be deflected by an electric field. Heinrich Hertz built a tube with a second pair of metal plates to either side of the cathode ray beam, a crude CRT. If the cathode rays were charged particles, their path should be bent by the electric field created when a voltage was applied to the plates, causing the spot of light where the rays hit to move sideways. He did not find any bending, but it was later determined that his tube was insufficiently evacuated, causing accumulations of surface charge which masked the electric field. Later Arthur Schuster repeated the experiment with a higher vacuum. He found that the rays were attracted toward a positively charged plate and repelled by a negative one, bending the beam. This was evidence they were negatively charged, and therefore not electromagnetic waves.

=== Magnetic deflection ===
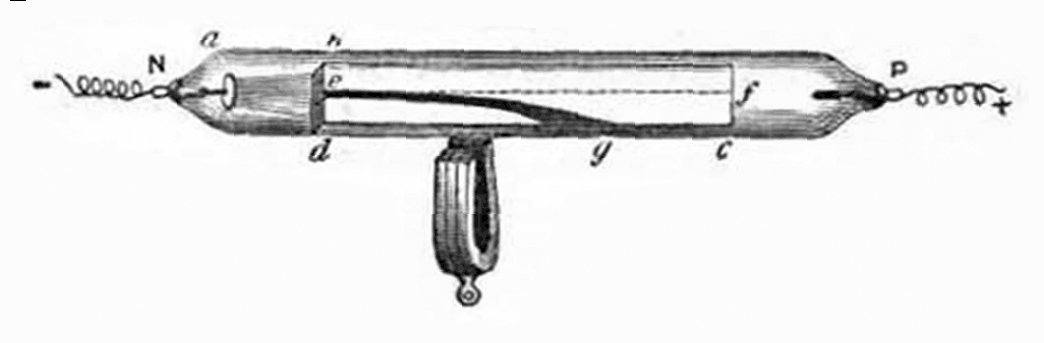
Crookes magnetic deflection tube

The rays path can be deflected by a magnetic field. Crookes put a magnet across the neck of the tube, so that the North pole was on one side of the beam and the South pole was on the other, and the beam travelled through the magnetic field between them. The beam was bent down, perpendicular to the magnetic field. To reveal the path of the beam, Crookes invented a tube (see pictures) with a cardboard screen with a phosphor coating down the length of the tube, at a slight angle so the electrons would strike the phosphor along its length, making a glowing line on the screen. The line could be seen to bend up or down in a transverse magnetic field. This effect (now called the Lorentz force) was similar to the behavior of electric currents in an electric motor and showed that the cathode rays obeyed Faraday's law of induction like currents in wires. Both electric and magnetic deflection were evidence for the particle theory, because electric and magnetic fields have no effect on a beam of light waves in vacuum.

=== Paddlewheel ===
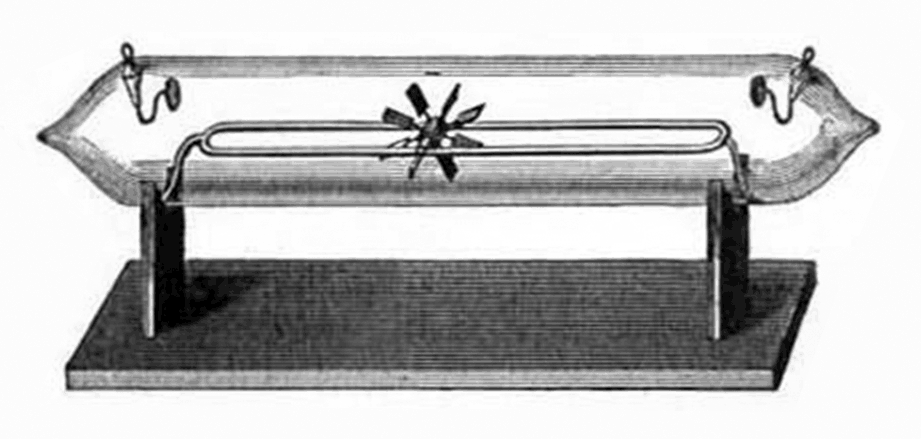
Crookes's paddlewheel tube, from his 1879 paper On Radiant Matter

Crookes put a tiny vaned turbine or paddlewheel in the path of the cathode rays, and found that it rotated when the rays hit it. The paddlewheel turned in a direction away from the cathode side of the tube, suggesting that the force of the cathode rays striking the paddles was causing the rotation. Crookes concluded at the time that this showed that cathode rays had momentum, so the rays were likely matter particles. However, later it was concluded that the paddle wheel turned not due to the momentum of the particles (or electrons) hitting the paddle wheel but due to the radiometric effect. When the rays hit the paddle surface they heated it, and the heat caused the gas next to it to expand, pushing the paddle. This was proven in 1903 by J. J. Thomson who calculated that the momentum of the electrons hitting the paddle wheel would only be sufficient to turn the wheel one revolution per minute. All this experiment really showed was that cathode rays were able to heat surfaces.

=== Negative electric charge ===
Jean-Baptiste Perrin wanted to determine whether the cathode rays actually carried negative charge, or whether they just accompanied the charge carriers, as the Germans thought. In 1895 he constructed a tube with a 'catcher', a closed aluminum cylinder with a small hole in the end facing the cathode, to collect the cathode rays. The catcher was attached to an electroscope to measure its charge. The electroscope showed a negative charge, proving that cathode rays really carry negative electricity.

=== Anode rays ===
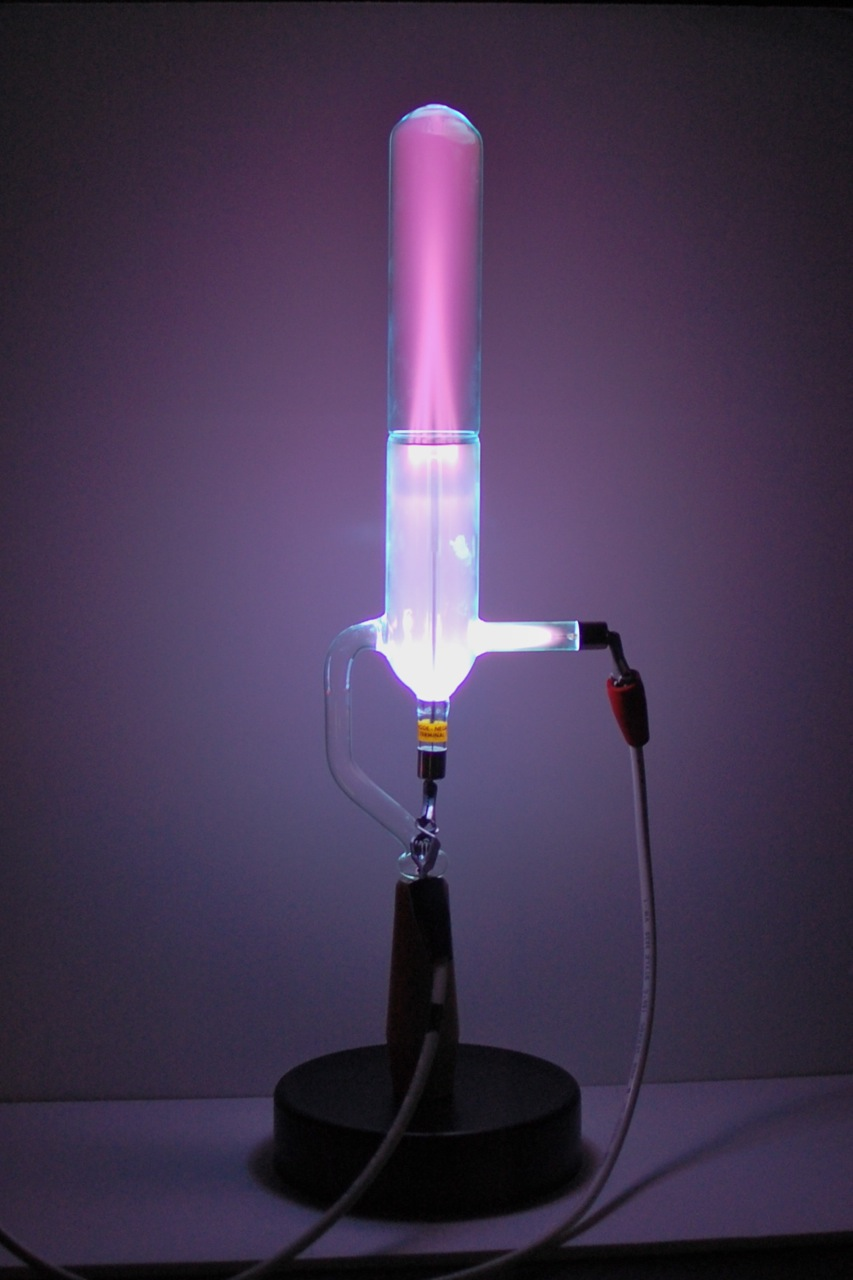
Special tube with perforated cathode, producing anode rays (top, pink)

Goldstein found in 1886 that if the cathode is made with small holes in it, streams of a faint luminous glow will be seen issuing from the holes on the back side of the cathode, facing away from the anode. It was found that in an electric field these anode rays bend in the opposite direction from cathode rays, toward a negatively charged plate, indicating that they carry a positive charge. These were the positive ions which were attracted to the cathode, and created the cathode rays. They were named canal rays (Kanalstrahlen) by Goldstein.

=== Spectral shift ===
Eugen Goldstein thought he had figured out a method of measuring the speed of cathode rays. If the glow discharge seen in the gas of Crookes tubes was produced by the moving cathode rays, the light radiated from them in the direction they were moving, down the tube, would be shifted in frequency due to the Doppler effect. This could be detected with a spectroscope because the emission line spectrum would be shifted. He built a tube shaped like an "L", with a spectroscope pointed through the glass of the elbow down one of the arms. He measured the spectrum of the glow when the spectroscope was pointed toward the cathode end, then switched the power supply connections so the cathode became the anode and the electrons were moving in the other direction, and again observed the spectrum looking for a shift. He did not find one, which he calculated meant that the rays were traveling very slowly. It was later recognized that the glow in Crookes tubes is emitted from gas atoms hit by the electrons, not the electrons themselves. Since the atoms are thousands of times more massive than the electrons, they move much slower, accounting for the lack of Doppler shift.

=== Lenard window ===
Lenard window tube

Philipp Lenard wanted to see if cathode rays could pass out of the Crookes tube into the air. See diagram. He built a tube with a "window" (W) in the glass envelope made of aluminum foil just thick enough to hold the atmospheric pressure out (later called a "Lenard window") facing the cathode (C) so the cathode rays would hit it. He found that something did come through. Holding a fluorescent screen up to the window caused it to fluoresce, even though no light reached it. A photographic plate held up to it would be darkened, even though it was not exposed to light. The effect had a very short range of about 2.5 centimetres (0.98 in). He measured the ability of cathode rays to penetrate sheets of material, and found they could penetrate much farther than moving atoms could. Since atoms were the smallest particles known at the time, this was first taken as evidence that cathode rays were waves. Later it was realized that electrons were much smaller than atoms, accounting for their greater penetration ability. Lenard was awarded the Nobel Prize in Physics in 1905 for his work.

Wilhelm Röntgen repeated Lenard's experiments and, on the evening of November 8, 1895, as darkness fell, discovered the emission of X-rays from the glass wall of his tube as he further reduced the residual gas pressure and increased the high voltage. He found that, under optimal conditions, the emission was accompanied by a yellowish glow from the wall struck by the cathode rays. Geissler had already observed a similar yellowish glow 35 years earlier without noticing X-rays. Röntgen was awarded the first Nobel Prize in Physics in 1901.

=== Wave-particle duality ===
Louis de Broglie later (1924) suggested in his doctoral dissertation that electrons are like photons and can act as waves. The wave-like behaviour of cathode rays was later directly demonstrated using reflection from a nickel surface by Davisson and Germer, and transmission through celluloid thin films and later metal films by George Paget Thomson and Alexander Reid in 1927. (Alexander Reid, who was Thomson's graduate student, performed the first experiments but he died soon after in a motorcycle accident and is rarely mentioned.)

== See also ==
- β (beta) particles
- Cathode ray tube
- Electron beam processing
- Electron diffraction
- Electron microscope
- Electron beam melting
- Electron beam welding
- Electron beam technology
- Electron gun
- Electron irradiation
- Ionizing radiation
- Particle accelerator
- Sterilisation (microbiology)
