= Eugen Goldstein =

German physicist (1850–1930)

- Born: 5 September 1850; Gleiwitz, Province of Silesia, Kingdom of Prussia, German Confederation
- Died: 25 December 1930 (aged 80); Berlin, Weimar Republic
- Resting place: Weißensee Cemetery, Berlin
- Education: University of Breslau; University of Berlin
- Known for: Work on cathode rays (1876); Discovering anode rays (1886)
- Relatives: Mikhail Goldstein (great-nephew); Boris Goldstein (great-nephew)
- Awards: Hughes Medal (1908)
- Scientific career
- Fields: Physics
- Workplaces: Berlin Observatory; Potsdam Observatory
- Academic advisors: Hermann von Helmholtz

Eugen Goldstein (/ˈɡoʊldstaɪn/; German: [ˈɡoːltʃtaɪn]; 5 September 1850 – 25 December 1930) was a German physicist. He was an early investigator of discharge tubes, and the discoverer of anode rays or canal rays, later identified as positive ions in the gas phase including the hydrogen ion.

== Life ==
Goldstein was born in 1850 in Gleiwitz (now known as Gliwice) to a Jewish family. He studied in Breslau and later in Berlin, under Helmholtz. Goldstein worked at the Berlin Observatory from 1878 to 1890, but spent most of his career at the Potsdam Observatory, where he became head of the astrophysical section in 1927. He died in 1930 in Berlin and was buried in the Weißensee Cemetery there. His great-nephews were Boris and Mikhail Goldstein.

== Work ==
In the mid-nineteenth century, Julius Plücker investigated the light emitted in discharge tubes and the influence of magnetic fields on the glow. Later, in 1869, Johann Wilhelm Hittorf studied discharge tubes with energy rays extending from a negative electrode, the cathode. These rays produced a fluorescence when they hit a tube's glass walls, and when interrupted by a solid object they cast a shadow.

In the 1870s, Goldstein undertook his own investigations of discharge tubes and named the light emissions studied by others Kathodenstrahlen, or cathode rays. He discovered several important properties of cathode rays, which contributed to their later identification as the first subatomic particle, the electron. He found that cathode rays were emitted perpendicularly from a metal surface, and carried energy. He attempted to measure their velocity by the Doppler shift of spectral lines in the glow emitted by Crookes tubes. He was awarded the Hughes Medal in 1908 for this work.

In 1886, he discovered that tubes with a perforated cathode also emit a glow at the cathode end. Goldstein concluded that in addition to the already-known cathode rays, later recognized as electrons moving from the negatively charged cathode toward the positively charged anode, there is another ray that travels in the opposite direction. Because these latter rays passed through the holes, or channels, in the cathode, Goldstein called them Kanalstrahlen, or canal rays. They are composed of positive ions whose identity depends on the residual gas inside the tube. It was another of Helmholtz's students, Wilhelm Wien, who later conducted extensive studies of canal rays, and in time this work would become part of the basis for mass spectrometry.

The anode ray with the largest e/m ratio comes from hydrogen gas (H_{2}), and is made of H^{+} ions. In other words, this ray is made of protons. Goldstein's work with anode rays of H^{+} was apparently the first observation of the proton, although strictly speaking it might be argued that it was Wien who measured the e/m ratio of the proton and should be credited with its discovery.

Goldstein also used discharge tubes to investigate comets. An object, such as a small ball of glass or iron, placed in the path of cathode rays produces secondary emissions to the sides, flaring outwards in a manner reminiscent of a comet's tail. See the work of Hedenus for pictures and additional information.
