= Electron-beam processing =

Use of high-energy electrons to treat an object

Electron-beam processing or electron irradiation is a process that involves using electrons, usually of high energy, to treat an object for a variety of purposes. This may take place under elevated temperatures and nitrogen atmosphere. Possible uses for electron irradiation include sterilization, alteration of gemstone colors, and cross-linking of polymers.

Electron energies typically vary from the keV to MeV range, depending on the depth of penetration required. The irradiation dose is usually measured in grays but also in Mrads (1 Gy is equivalent to 100 rad).

The basic components of a typical electron-beam processing device include: an electron gun (consisting of a cathode, grid, and anode), used to generate and accelerate the primary beam; and, a magnetic optical (focusing and deflection) system, used for controlling the way in which the electron beam impinges on the material being processed (the "workpiece"). In operation, the gun's hot cathode emits electrons that are both accelerated and shaped into a collimated beam by the electrostatic field geometry established by the gun's electrode configuration (grid and anode). The electron beam then emerges from the gun assembly through an exit hole in the ground-plane anode with an energy equal to the value of the negative high voltage (gun operating voltage) being applied to the cathode. This use of a direct high voltage to produce a high-energy electron beam allows the conversion of input electrical power to beam power at greater than 95% efficiency, making electron-beam material processing a highly energy-efficient technique. After exiting the gun, the beam passes through an electromagnetic lens and deflection coil system. The lens is used for producing either a focused or defocused beam spot on the workpiece, while the deflection coil is used to either position the beam spot on a stationary location or provide some form of oscillatory motion. The electrons leave the gun, are deflected and focused in a vacuum. Often this system has a flat horn-like shape in order to deflect the electrons into a curtain. The electrons exit into the air ahead of the horn via a window at the end of the horn, made of a thin foil of a low-z material such as titanium, aluminum or their foils. As the electrons pass through the window they heat it so it is cooled with air jets.

In polymers, an electron beam may be used on the material to induce effects such as chain scission (which makes the polymer chain shorter) and cross-linking. The result is a change in the properties of the polymer, which is intended to extend the range of applications for the material. The effects of irradiation may also include changes in crystallinity, as well as microstructure. Usually, the irradiation process degrades the polymer. The irradiated polymers may sometimes be characterized using DSC, XRD, FTIR, or SEM.

In poly(vinylidene fluoride-trifluoroethylene) copolymers, high-energy electron irradiation lowers the energy barrier for the ferroelectric-paraelectric phase transition and reduces polarization hysteresis losses in the material.

Electron-beam processing involves irradiation (treatment) of products using a high-energy electron-beam accelerator. Electron-beam accelerators utilize an on-off technology, with a common design being similar to that of a cathode ray television.

Electron-beam processing is used in industry primarily for three product modifications:

- Crosslinking of polymer-based products to improve mechanical, thermal, chemical, and other properties,
- Material degradation often used in the recycling of materials,
- Sterilization of medical and pharmaceutical goods.

Nanotechnology is one of the fastest-growing new areas in science and engineering. Radiation is an applied tool in this area; arrangement of atoms and ions has been performed using ion or electron beams for many years. New applications concern nanocluster and nanocomposites synthesis.

== Crosslinking ==
The crosslinking of polymers through electron-beam processing changes a thermoplastic material into a thermoset. When polymers are crosslinked, the molecular movement is severely impeded, making the polymer stable against heat. This locking together of molecules is the origin of all of the benefits of crosslinking, including the improvement of the following properties:

- Thermal: resistance to temperature, aging, low-temperature impact, etc.
- Mechanical: tensile strength, modulus, abrasion resistance, pressure rating, creep resistance, etc.
- Chemical: stress crack resistance, etc.
- Other: heat shrink memory properties, positive temperature coefficient, etc.

Cross-linking is the interconnection of adjacent long molecules with networks of bonds induced by chemical treatment or electron-beam treatment. Electron-beam processing of thermoplastic material results in an array of enhancements, such as an increase in tensile strength and resistance to abrasions, stress cracking, and solvents. Joint replacements such as knees and hips are being manufactured from cross-linked ultra-high-molecular-weight polyethylene because of the excellent wear characteristics due to extensive research.

Polymers commonly crosslinked using the electron-beam irradiation process include polyvinyl chloride (PVC), thermoplastic polyurethanes and elastomers (TPUs), polybutylene terephthalate (PBT), polyamides / nylon (PA66, PA6, PA11, PA12), polyvinylidene fluoride (PVDF), polymethylpentene (PMP), polyethylenes (LLDPE, LDPE, MDPE, HDPE, UHMWPE), and ethylene copolymers such as ethylene-vinyl acetate (EVA) and ethylene tetrafluoroethylene (ETFE). Some of the polymers utilize additives to make the polymer more readily irradiation-crosslinkable.

An example of an electron-beam crosslinked part is connector made from polyamide, designed to withstand the higher temperatures needed for soldering with the lead-free solder required by the RoHS initiative.

Crosslinked polyethylene piping called PEX is commonly used as an alternative to copper piping for water lines in newer home construction. PEX piping outlasts copper and has performance characteristics that are superior to copper in many ways.

Foam is also produced using electron-beam processing to produce high-quality, fine-celled, aesthetically pleasing product.

== Long-chain branching ==
The resin pellets used to produce the foam and thermoformed parts can be electron-beam-processed to a lower dose level than when crosslinking and gels occur. These resin pellets, such as polypropylene and polyethylene can be used to create lower-density foams and other parts, as the "melt strength" of the polymer is increased.

== Chain scissioning ==
Chain scissioning or polymer degradation can also be achieved through electron-beam processing. The effect of the electron beam can cause the degradation of polymers, breaking chains and therefore reducing the molecular weight. The chain scissioning effects observed in polytetrafluoroethylene (PTFE) have been used to create fine micropowders from scrap or off-grade materials.

Chain scission is the breaking apart of molecular chains to produce required molecular sub-units from the chain. Electron-beam processing provides Chain scission without the use of harsh chemicals usually utilized to initiate chain scission.

An example of this process is the breaking down of cellulose fibers extracted from wood in order to shorten the molecules, thereby producing a raw material that can then be used to produce biodegradable detergents and diet-food substitutes.

"Teflon" (PTFE) is also electron-beam-processed, allowing it to be ground to a fine powder for use in inks and as coatings for the automotive industry.

== Microbiological sterilization ==
Electron-beam processing has the ability to break the chains of DNA in living organisms, such as bacteria, resulting in microbial death and rendering the space they inhabit sterile. E-beam processing has been used for the sterilization of medical products and aseptic packaging materials for foods, as well as disinfestation, the elimination of live insects from grain, tobacco, and other unprocessed bulk crops.

Sterilization with electrons has significant advantages over other methods of sterilization currently in use. The process is quick, reliable, and compatible with most materials, and does not require any quarantine following the processing. For some materials and products that are sensitive to oxidative effects, radiation tolerance levels for electron-beam irradiation may be slightly higher than for gamma exposure. This is due to the higher dose rates and shorter exposure times of e-beam irradiation, which have been shown to reduce the degradative effects of oxygen.
