= Johann Wilhelm Hittorf =

German physicist (1824–1914)

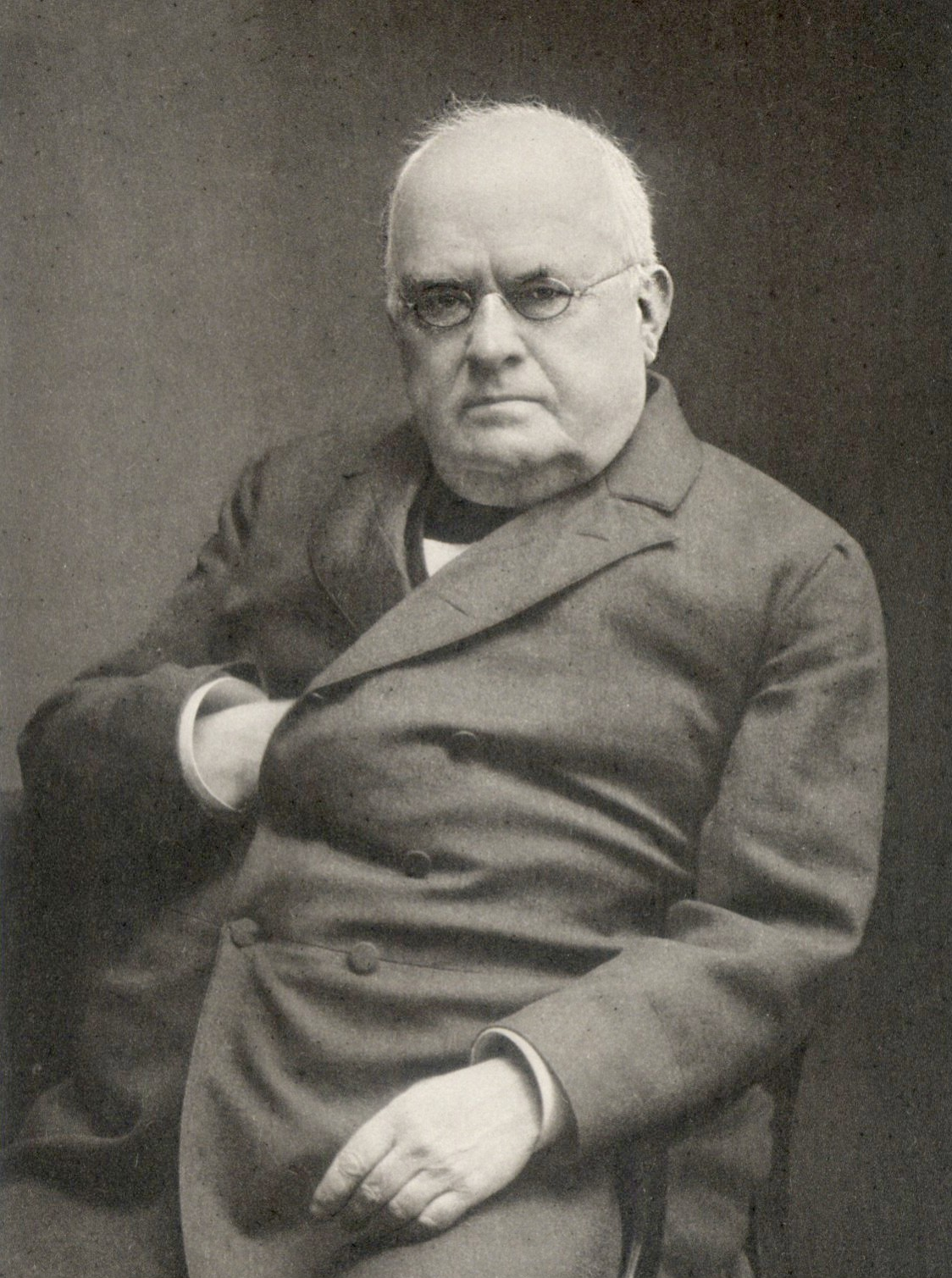
- Hittorf c. 1904
- Born: 27 March 1824; Bonn, Rhine Province, Kingdom of Prussia
- Died: 28 November 1914 (aged 90); Münster, Province of Westphalia, German Empire
- Known for: Crookes–Hittorf tube Hittorf's metallic phosphorus Ion transport number
- Awards: Hughes Medal (1903)
- Scientific career
- Fields: Physics

Signature
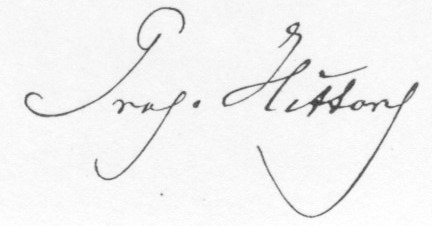

Johann Wilhelm Hittorf (27 March 1824 – 28 November 1914) was a German physicist who was born in Bonn and died in Münster, Germany.

Hittorf was the first to compute the electricity-carrying capacity of charged atoms and molecules (ions), an important factor for understanding electrochemical reactions. He formulated ion transport numbers and the first method for their measurements.

He experimented with tubes containing energy rays extending from a negative electrode. These rays produced a fluorescence when they hit the glass walls of the tubes. In 1876 the effect was named "cathode rays" by Eugen Goldstein.

Hittorf's early investigations concerned the allotropes of phosphorus and selenium. Between 1853 and 1859 his most important work concerned ion movement caused by electric current. In 1853 Hittorf revealed that some ions traveled more rapidly than others. This observation resulted in the concept of transport number, the fraction of the electric current carried by each ionic species. He measured the changes of the concentration of electrolyzed solutions, computed from these the transport numbers (relative carrying capacities) of many ions, and, in 1869, published his principles governing the migration of ions.

He became professor of physics and chemistry for the University of Münster and director of laboratories there from 1879 until 1889. He also investigated the light spectra of gases and vapours, worked on the passage of electricity through gases, and discovered new properties of cathode rays (electron rays). In 1869 he ascertained that the cathode rays glowed different colours because of different gasses and pressures. He noticed that when there was any object placed between the cathode and the illuminating side of the tube, then the shadow of that object appeared.

His work resulted in the development of cathode-ray tubes (CRT). The measurement of current in a vacuum tube was an important factor for the development of vacuum tube diodes. CRTs were used as storage devices of the memory of the Manchester Baby computer, the SSEM.

He was elected to honorary membership of the Manchester Literary and Philosophical Society in 17 April 1871.
