= Crookes tube =

Type of discharge tube

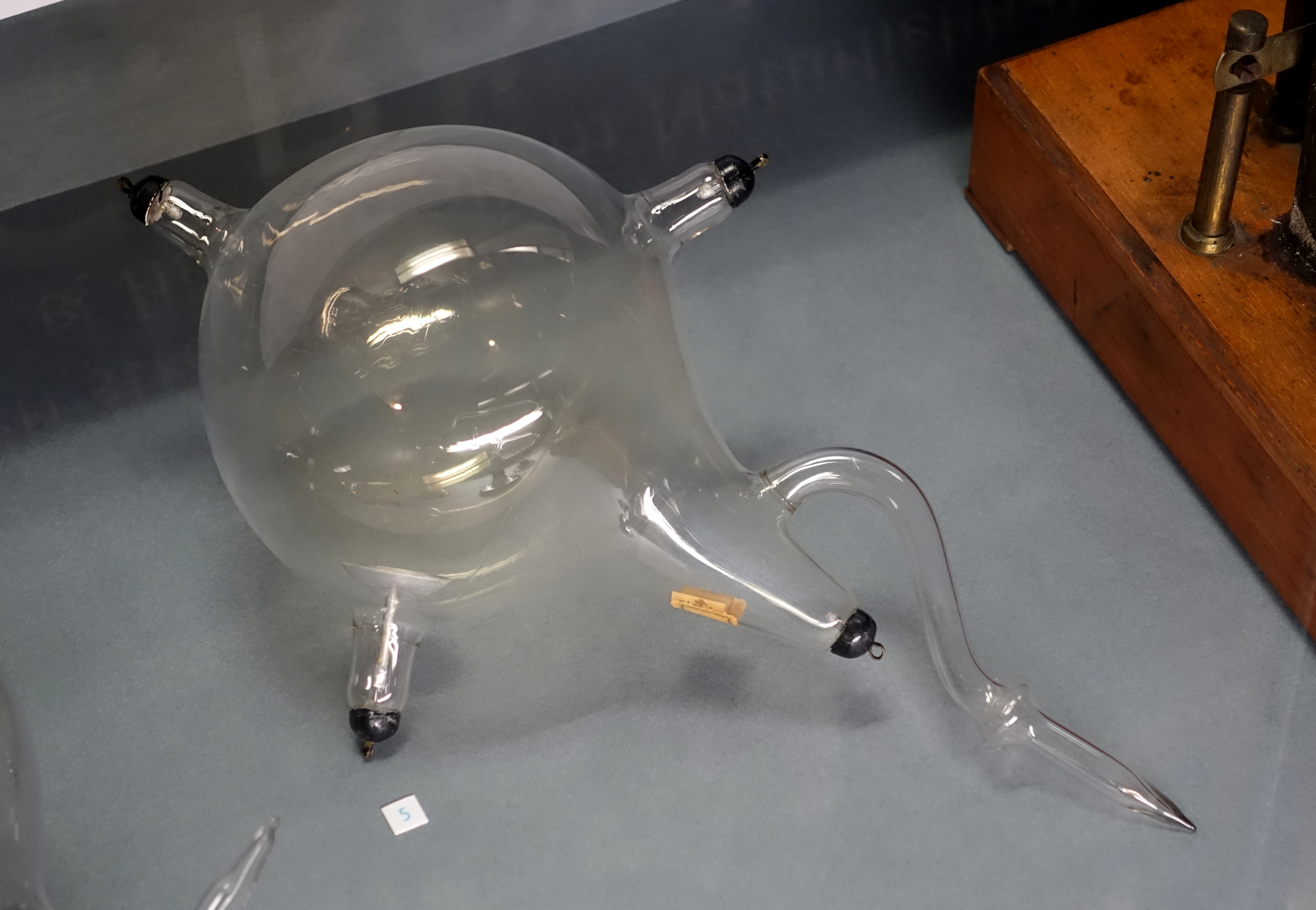
- Experimental Crookes tube belonging to Wilhelm Röntgen, c. 1890, at Gedächtnisstätte Würzburg (Rontgen Memorial), Würzburg, Germany
- Uses: Observing and studying cathode rays
- Notable experiments: Discovery of X-rays
- Inventor: William Crookes
- Related items: X-ray tube Cathode-ray tube

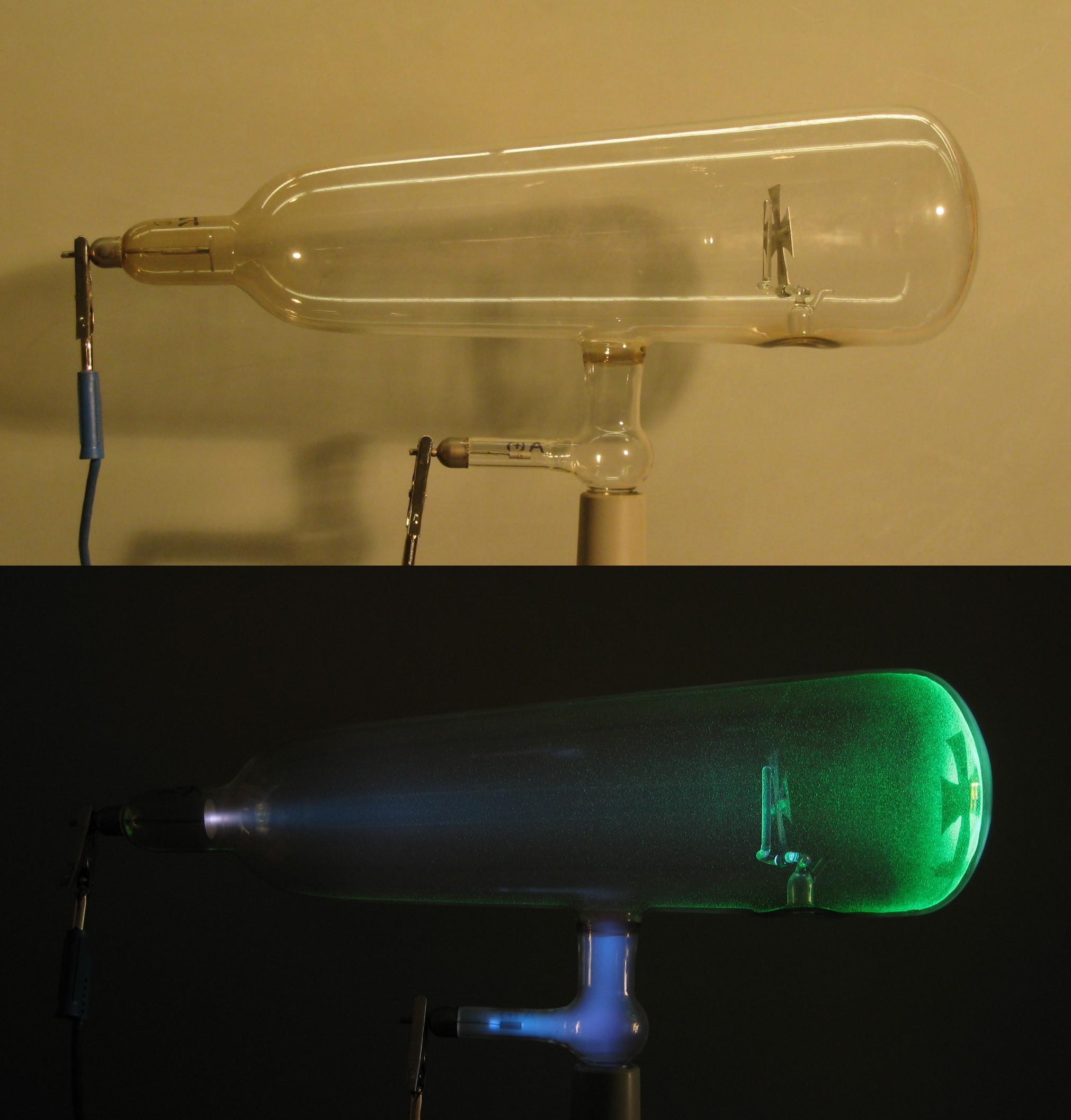
A Crookes tube: light and dark. Electrons (cathode rays) travel in straight lines from the cathode (left), as shown by the shadow cast by the metal Maltese cross on the fluorescence of the righthand glass wall of the tube. The anode is the electrode at the bottom

A Crookes tube (also Crookes–Hittorf tube) is an early experimental discharge tube with partial vacuum invented by English physicist William Crookes and others around 1869–1875, in which cathode rays, streams of electrons, were discovered.

Developed from the earlier Geissler tube, the Crookes tube consists of a partially evacuated glass bulb of various shapes, with two metal electrodes, the cathode and the anode, one at either end. When a high voltage is applied between the electrodes, cathode rays (electrons) are projected in straight lines from the cathode. It was used by Crookes, Johann Hittorf, Julius Plücker, Eugen Goldstein, Heinrich Hertz, Philipp Lenard, Kristian Birkeland and others to discover the properties of cathode rays, culminating in J. J. Thomson's 1897 identification of cathode rays as negatively charged particles, which were later named electrons. Crookes tubes are now used only for demonstrating cathode rays.

Wilhelm Röntgen discovered X-rays using the Crookes tube in 1895. The term Crookes tube is also used for the first generation, cold cathode X-ray tubes, which evolved from the experimental Crookes tubes and were used until about 1920.

== History ==
=== Invention ===
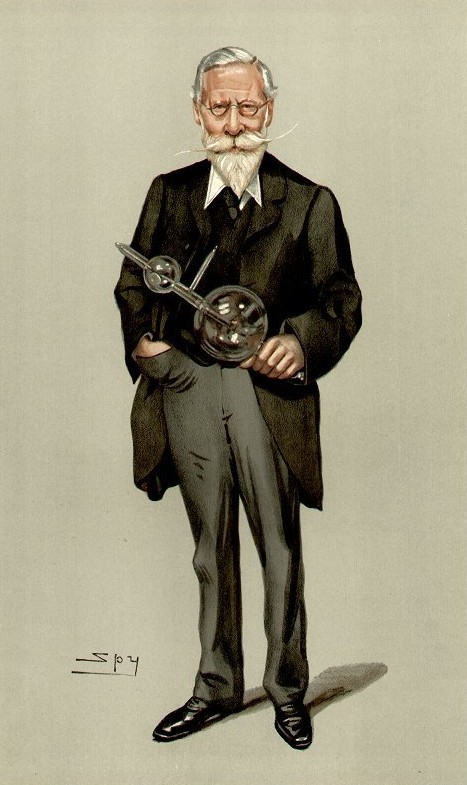
William Crookes and his glowing tubes gained renown, as shown by this 1902 caricature in Vanity Fair. The caption read "ubi Crookes ibi lux", which in Latin means roughly, "Where there is Crookes, there is light"

Crookes tubes evolved from the earlier Geissler tubes invented by the German physicist and glassblower Heinrich Geissler in 1857, experimental tubes which are similar to modern neon tube lights. Geissler tubes had only a low vacuum, around 10^{−3} atm (100 Pa), and the electrons in them could only travel a short distance before hitting a gas molecule. So the current of electrons moved in a slow diffusion process, constantly colliding with gas molecules, never gaining much energy. These tubes did not create beams of cathode rays, only a colorful glow discharge that filled the tube as the electrons struck the gas molecules and excited them, producing light.

By the 1870s, William Crookes (among other researchers) was able to evacuate his tubes to a lower pressure, 10^{−6} to 5 × 10^{−8} atm, using an improved Sprengel mercury vacuum pump invented by his coworker Charles A. Gimingham. He found that as he pumped more air out of his tubes, a dark area in the glowing gas formed next to the cathode. As the pressure got lower, the dark area, now called the Faraday dark space or Crookes dark space, spread down the tube, until the inside of the tube was totally dark. However, the glass envelope of the tube began to glow at the anode end. What was happening was that as more air was pumped out of the tube, there were fewer gas molecules to obstruct the motion of the electrons from the cathode, so they could travel a longer distance, on average, before they struck one. By the time the inside of the tube became dark, they were able to travel in straight lines from the cathode to the anode, without a collision. They were accelerated to a high velocity by the electric field between the electrodes, both because they did not lose energy to collisions, and also because Crookes tubes were operated at a higher voltage. By the time they reached the anode end of the tube, they were going so fast that many flew past the anode and hit the glass wall. The electrons themselves were invisible, but when they hit the glass walls of the tube they excited the atoms in the glass, making them give off light or fluoresce, usually yellow-green. Later experimenters painted the back wall of Crookes tubes with fluorescent paint, to make the beams more visible.

This accidental fluorescence allowed researchers to notice that objects in the tube, such as the anode, cast a sharp-edged shadow on the tube wall. Johann Hittorf was first to recognise in 1869 that something must be travelling in straight lines from the cathode to cast the shadow. In 1876, Eugen Goldstein proved that they came from the cathode, and named them cathode rays (Kathodenstrahlen).

At the time, atoms were the smallest particles known and were believed to be indivisible, the electron was unknown, and what carried electric currents was a mystery. During the last quarter of the 19th century, many ingenious types of Crookes tubes were invented and used in historic experiments to determine what cathode rays were. There were two theories: Crookes believed they were 'radiant matter'; that is, electrically charged atoms, while German scientists Hertz and Goldstein believed they were 'aether vibrations'; some new form of electromagnetic waves. The debate was resolved in 1897 when J. J. Thomson measured the mass to charge ratio of the cathode rays, showing they were made of particles, but were around 1800 times lighter than the lightest atom, hydrogen. Therefore, they were not atoms, but a new particle, the first subatomic particle to be discovered, which was later named the electron.

The colorful glowing tubes were also popular in public lectures to demonstrate the mysteries of the new science of electricity. Decorative tubes were made with fluorescent minerals, or butterfly figures painted with fluorescent paint, sealed inside. When power was applied, the fluorescent materials lit up with many glowing colors.

In 1895, Wilhelm Röntgen discovered X-rays emanating from Crookes tubes. The many uses for X-rays were immediately apparent, the first practical application for Crookes tubes. Medical manufacturers began to produce specialized Crookes tubes to generate X-rays, the first X-ray tubes.

Crookes tubes were unreliable and temperamental. Both the energy and the quantity of cathode rays produced depended on the pressure of residual gas in the tube. Over time the gas was absorbed by the walls of the tube, reducing the pressure. This reduced the amount of cathode rays produced and caused the voltage across the tube to increase, creating more energetic cathode rays. In Crookes X-ray tubes this phenomenon was called "hardening" because the higher voltage produced "harder", more penetrating X-rays; a tube with a higher vacuum was called a "hard" tube, while one with lower vacuum was a "soft" tube. Eventually the pressure got so low the tube stopped working entirely. To prevent this, in heavily used tubes such as X-ray tubes various "softener" devices were incorporated that released a small amount of gas, restoring the tube's function.

The electronic vacuum tubes invented later around 1904 superseded the Crookes tube. These operate at a still lower pressure, around 10^{−9} atm (10^{−4} Pa), at which there are so few gas molecules that they do not conduct by ionization. Instead, they use a more reliable and controllable source of electrons, a heated filament or hot cathode which releases electrons by thermionic emission. The ionization method of creating cathode rays used in Crookes tubes is today only used in a few specialized gas discharge tubes such as thyratrons.

The technology of manipulating electron beams pioneered in Crookes tubes was applied practically in the design of vacuum tubes, and particularly in the invention of the cathode-ray tube by Ferdinand Braun in 1897 and is now used in sophisticated processes such as electron microscopes and electron beam lithography.

=== Discovery of X-rays ===
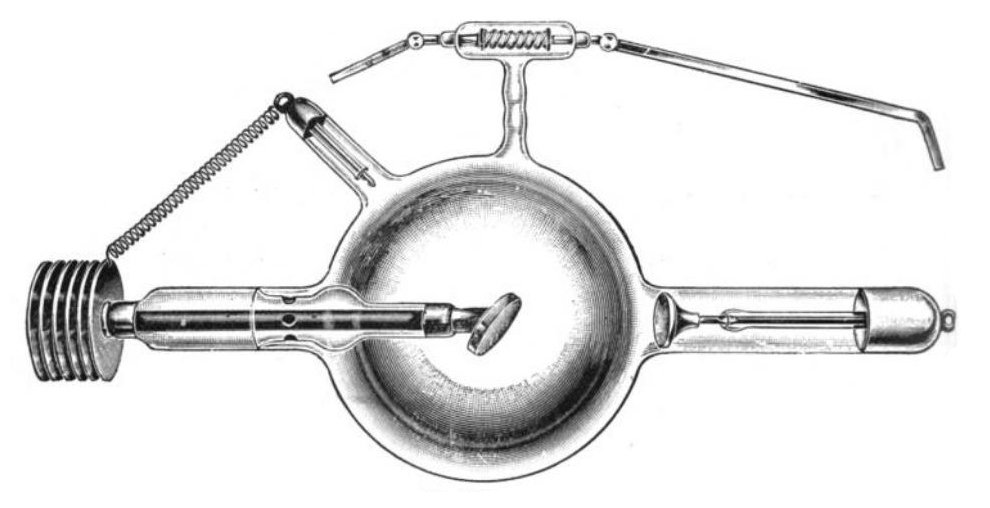
Crookes X-ray tube from around 1910

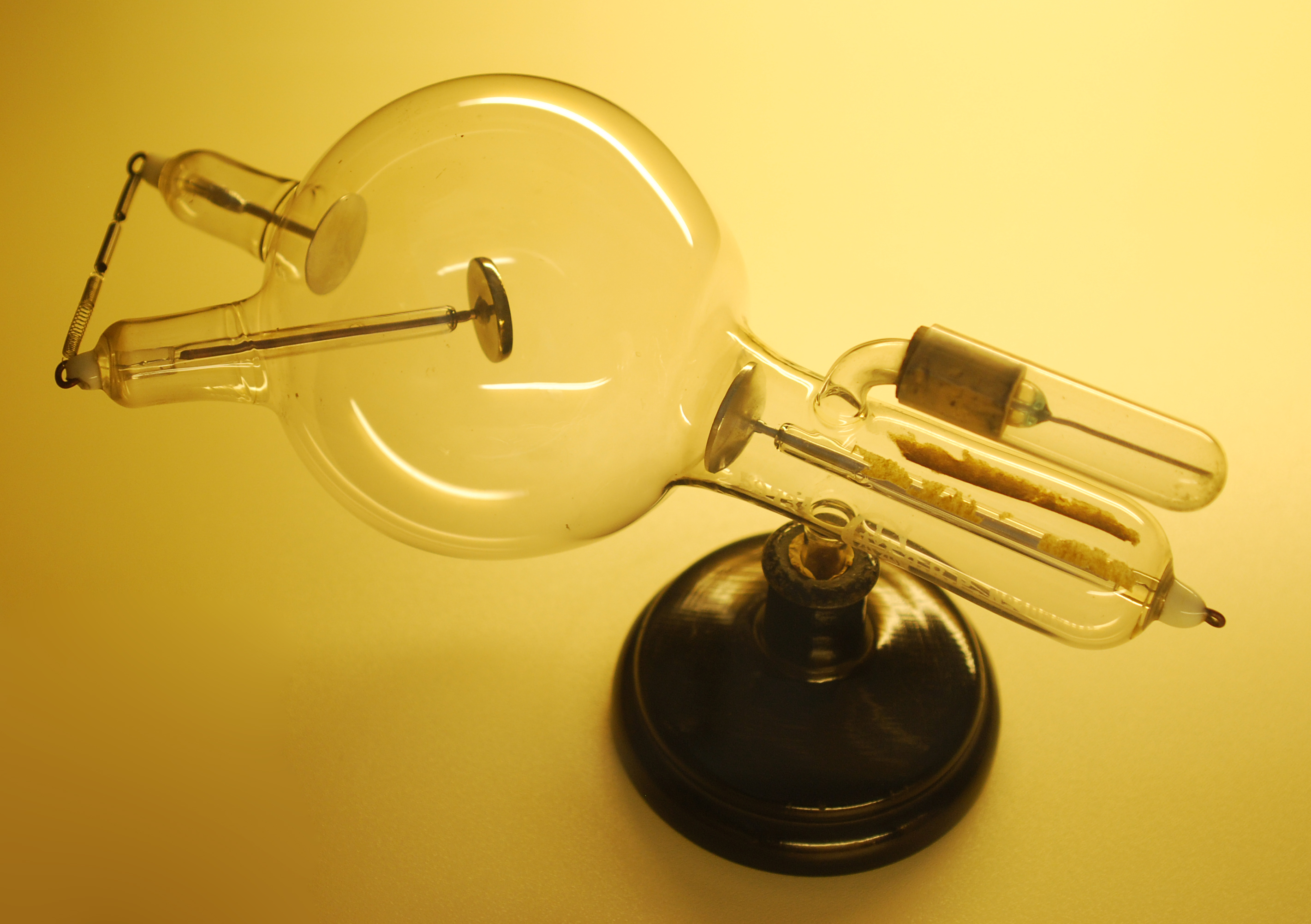
Another Crookes x-ray tube. The device attached to the neck of the tube (right) is an "osmotic softener"

When the voltage applied to a Crookes tube is high enough, around 5,000 volts or greater, it can accelerate the electrons to a high enough velocity to create X-rays when they hit the anode or the glass wall of the tube. The fast electrons emit X-rays when their path is bent sharply as they pass near the high electric charge of an atom's nucleus, a process called bremsstrahlung, or they knock an atom's inner electrons into a higher energy level, and these in turn emit X-rays as they return to their former energy level, a process called X-ray fluorescence. Many early Crookes tubes undoubtedly generated X-rays, because early researchers such as Ivan Pulyui had noticed that they could make foggy marks on nearby unexposed photographic plates.

On November 8, 1895, Wilhelm Röntgen was operating a Crookes tube covered with black cardboard when he noticed that a nearby fluorescent screen glowed faintly. He realized that some unknown invisible rays from the tube were able to pass through the cardboard and make the screen fluoresce. He found that they could pass through books and papers on his desk. Röntgen began to investigate the rays full-time, and on December 28, 1895, published the first scientific research paper on X-rays. Röntgen was awarded the first Nobel Prize in Physics (in 1901) for his discoveries.

The many applications of X-rays created the first practical use for Crookes tubes, and workshops began manufacturing specialized Crookes tubes to generate X-rays, the first X-ray tubes. The anode was made of a heavy metal, usually platinum, which generated more X-rays, and was tilted at an angle to the cathode, so the X-rays would radiate through the side of the tube. The cathode had a concave spherical surface which focused the electrons into a small spot around 1 mm in diameter on the anode, in order to approximate a point source of X-rays, which gave the sharpest radiographs. These cold cathode type X-ray tubes were used until about 1920, when they were superseded by the hot cathode Coolidge X-ray tube.

== Operation ==
Diagram showing a Crookes tube circuit

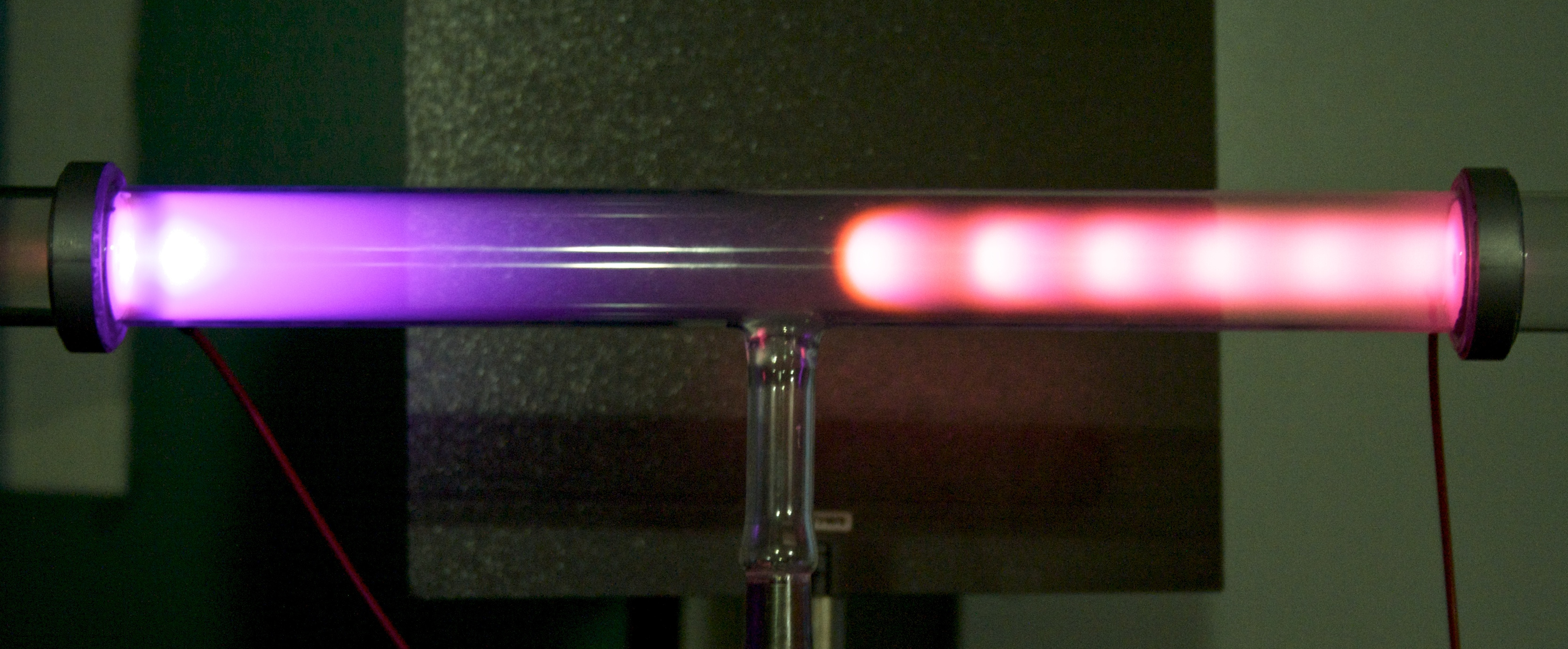
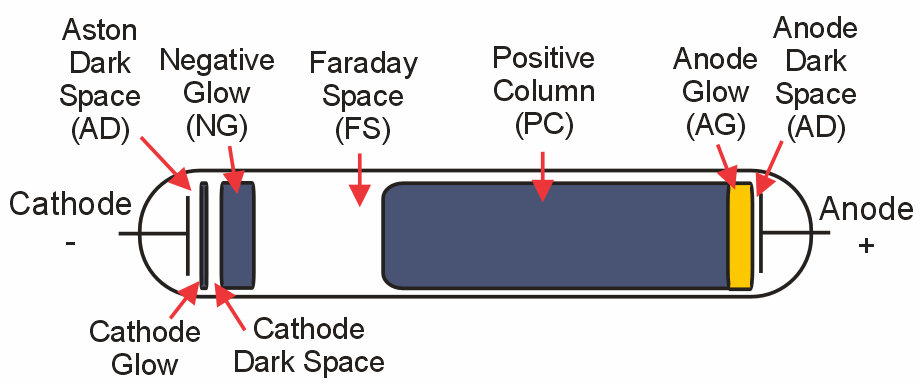
When the amount of gas in a Crookes tube is a little higher, it produces a pattern of glowing regions of gas called a glow discharge

Crookes tubes are cold cathode tubes, meaning that they do not have a heated filament in them that releases electrons as the later electronic vacuum tubes usually do. Instead, electrons are generated by the ionization of the residual air by a high DC voltage (from a few kilovolts to about 100 kilovolts) applied between the cathode and anode electrodes in the tube, usually by an induction coil (a "Ruhmkorff coil"). The Crookes tubes require a small amount of air in them to function, from about 10^{−6} to 5 × 10^{−8} atmosphere (7 × 10^{−4} - 4 × 10^{−5} torr or 0.1-0.006 pascal).

When high voltage is applied to the tube, the electric field accelerates the small number of electrically charged ions and free electrons always present in the gas, created by natural processes like photoionization and radioactivity. The electrons collide with other gas molecules, knocking electrons off them and creating more positive ions. The electrons go on to create more ions and electrons in a chain reaction called a Townsend discharge. All the positive ions are attracted to the cathode or negative electrode. When they strike it, they knock large numbers of electrons out of the surface of the metal, which in turn are repelled by the cathode and attracted to the anode or positive electrode. These are the cathode rays.

Enough of the air has been removed from the tube that most of the electrons can travel the length of the tube without striking a gas molecule. The high voltage accelerates these low-mass particles to a high velocity (about 37,000 miles per second, or 59,000 km/s, about 20 percent of the speed of light, for a typical tube voltage of 10 kV). When they get to the anode end of the tube, they have so much momentum that, although they are attracted to the anode, many fly past it and strike the end wall of the tube. When they strike atoms in the glass, they knock their orbital electrons into a higher energy level. When the electrons fall back to their original energy level, they emit light. This process, called cathodoluminescence, causes the glass to glow, usually yellow-green. The electrons themselves are invisible, but the glow reveals where the beam of electrons strikes the glass. Later on, researchers painted the inside back wall of the tube with a phosphor, a fluorescent chemical such as zinc sulfide, in order to make the glow more visible. After striking the wall, the electrons eventually make their way to the anode, flow through the anode wire, the power supply, and back to the cathode.

The full details of the action in a Crookes tube are complicated, because it contains a nonequilibrium plasma of positively charged ions, electrons, and neutral atoms which are constantly interacting. At higher gas pressures, above 10^{−6} atm (0.1 Pa), this creates a glow discharge; a pattern of different colored glowing regions in the gas, depending on the pressure in the tube (see diagram). The details were not fully understood until the development of plasma physics in the early 20th century.

== Experiments ==
During the last quarter of the 19th century Crookes tubes were used in dozens of historic experiments to try to find out what cathode rays were. There were two theories: British scientists Crookes and Cromwell Varley believed they were particles of 'radiant matter', that is, electrically charged atoms. German researchers E. Wiedemann, Heinrich Hertz, and Eugen Goldstein believed they were 'aether vibrations', some new form of electromagnetic waves, and were separate from what carried the current through the tube. The debate continued until J. J. Thomson measured cathode ray’s mass, proving they were a previously unknown negatively charged particle in an atom, the first subatomic particle, which he called a 'corpuscle' but was later renamed the 'electron'.

=== Cathode rays move in parallel lines ===
Julius Plücker in 1869 built a tube with an anode shaped like a Maltese Cross facing the cathode. It was hinged, so it could fold down against the floor of the tube. When the tube was turned on, the cathode rays cast a sharp cross-shaped shadow on the fluorescence on the back face of the tube, showing that the rays moved in straight lines. This fluorescence was used as an argument that cathode rays were electromagnetic waves, since the only thing known to cause fluorescence at the time was ultraviolet light. After a while the fluorescence would get 'tired' and the glow would decrease. If the cross was folded down out of the path of the rays, it no longer cast a shadow, and the previously shadowed area would fluoresce more strongly than the area around it.

=== Perpendicular emission ===
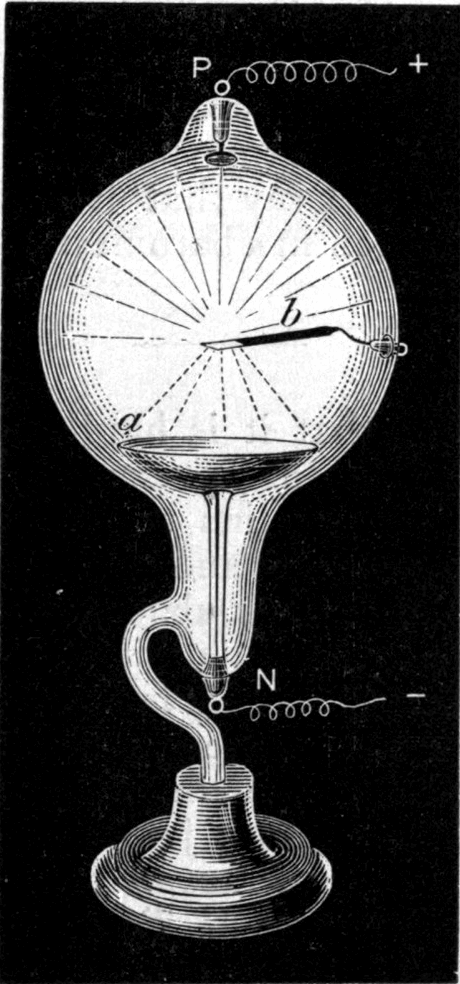
Crookes tube with concave cathode

Eugen Goldstein in 1876 found that cathode rays were always emitted perpendicular to the cathode's surface. If the cathode was a flat plate, the rays were shot out in straight lines perpendicular to the plane of the plate. This was evidence that they were particles, because a luminous object, like a red hot metal plate, emits light in all directions, while a charged particle will be repelled by the cathode in a perpendicular direction. Cathode rays heat matter which they strike. If the electrode was made in the form of a concave spherical dish, the cathode rays would be focused to a spot in front of the dish. This could be used to heat samples to a high temperature.

=== Electrostatic deflection ===
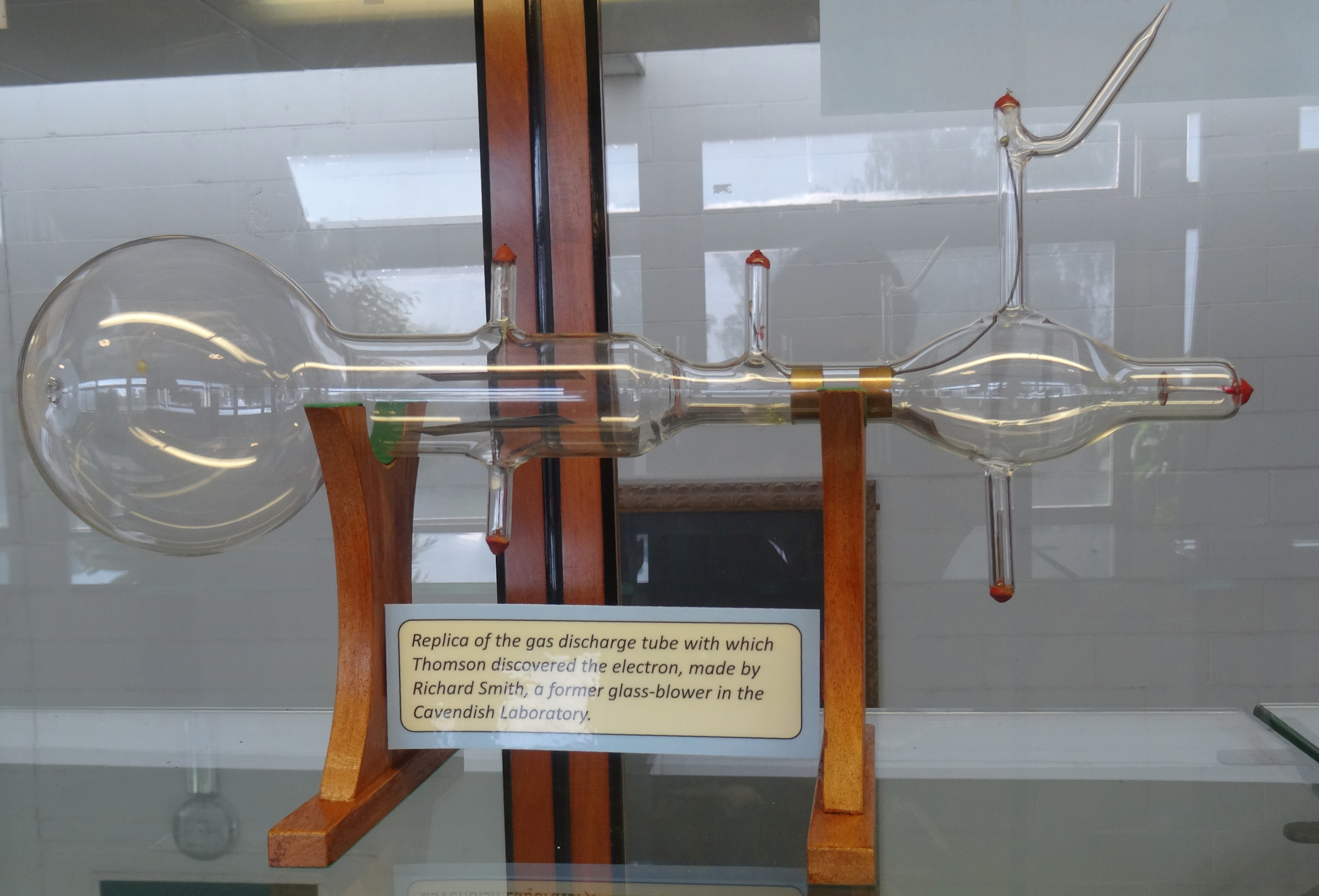
J. J, Thomson's electric deflection tube. The cathode is on R. The electron beam is accelerated passing through the cylindrical high voltage anode (center), bent by a voltage on the deflection plates (center L), and strikes the back wall of the tube (L) causing a luminous glow.

Heinrich Hertz built a tube with a second pair of metal plates to either side of the cathode ray beam, a crude CRT. If the cathode rays were charged particles, their path should be bent by the electric field created when a voltage was applied to the plates, causing the spot of light where the rays hit to move sideways. He did not find any bending, but it was later determined that his tube was insufficiently evacuated, causing accumulations of surface charge which masked the electric field. Later Arthur Schuster repeated the experiment with a higher vacuum. He found that the rays were attracted toward a positively charged plate and repelled by a negative one, bending the beam. This was evidence they were negatively charged, and therefore not electromagnetic waves.

=== Magnetic deflection ===
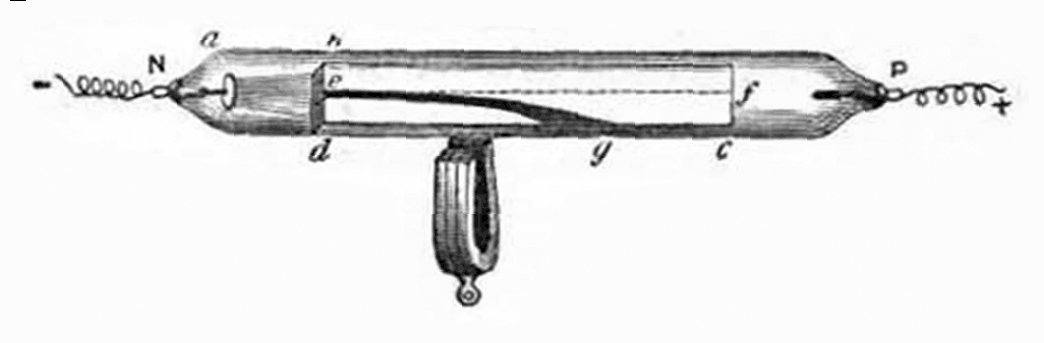
Crookes magnetic deflection tube

Deflection of electron beam with bar magnet

Crookes put a magnet across the neck of the tube, so that the North pole was on one side of the beam and the South pole was on the other, and the beam travelled through the magnetic field between them. The beam was bent down, perpendicular to the magnetic field. To reveal the path of the beam, Crookes invented a tube (see pictures) with a cardboard screen with a phosphor coating down the length of the tube, at a slight angle so the electrons would strike the phosphor along its length, making a glowing line on the screen. The line could be seen to bend up or down in a transverse magnetic field. This effect (now called the Lorentz force) was similar to the behavior of electric currents in an electric motor and showed that the cathode rays obeyed Faraday's law of induction like currents in wires. Both electric and magnetic deflection were evidence for the particle theory, because static electric and magnetic fields have no effect on a beam of light waves in vacuum.

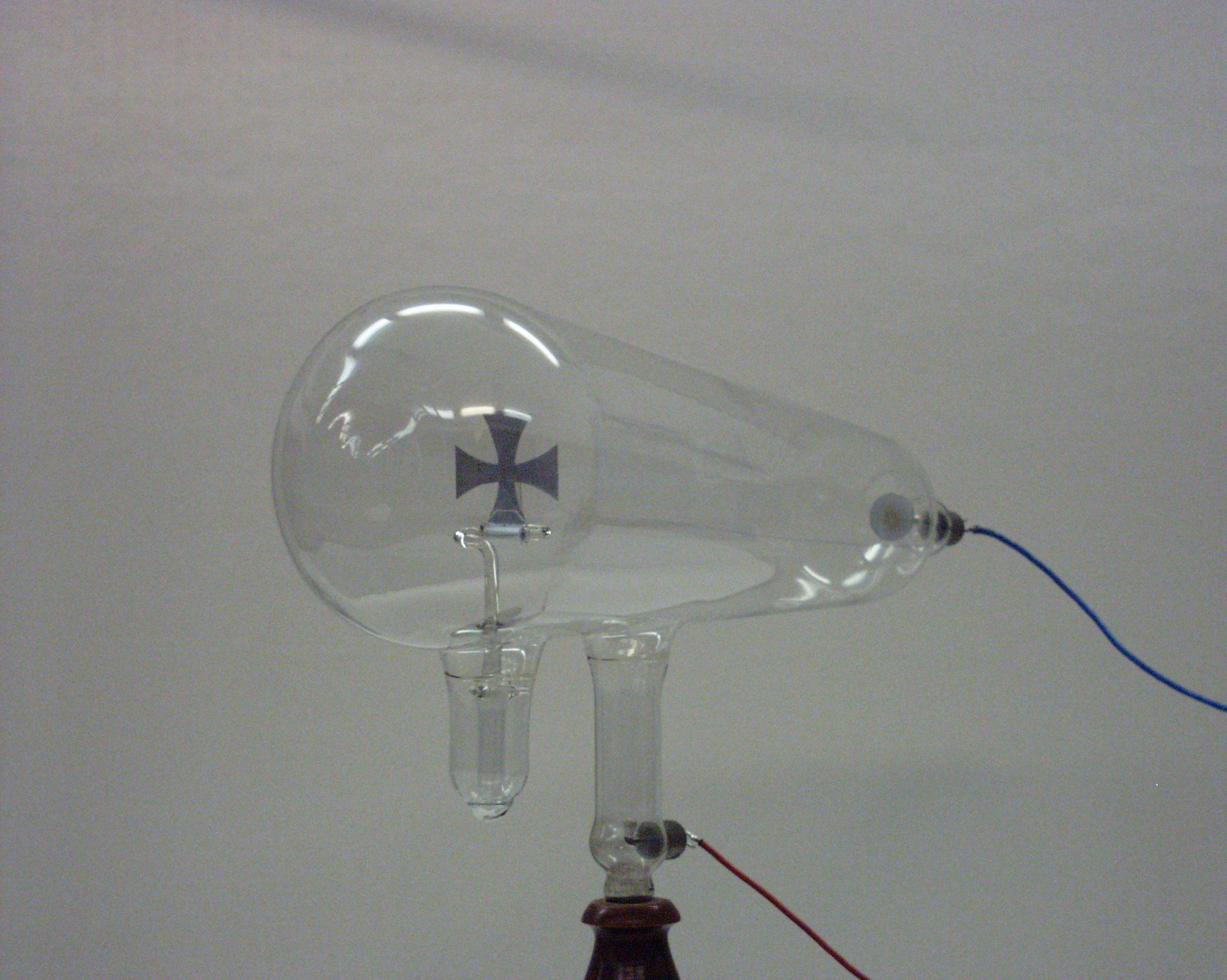
Power off

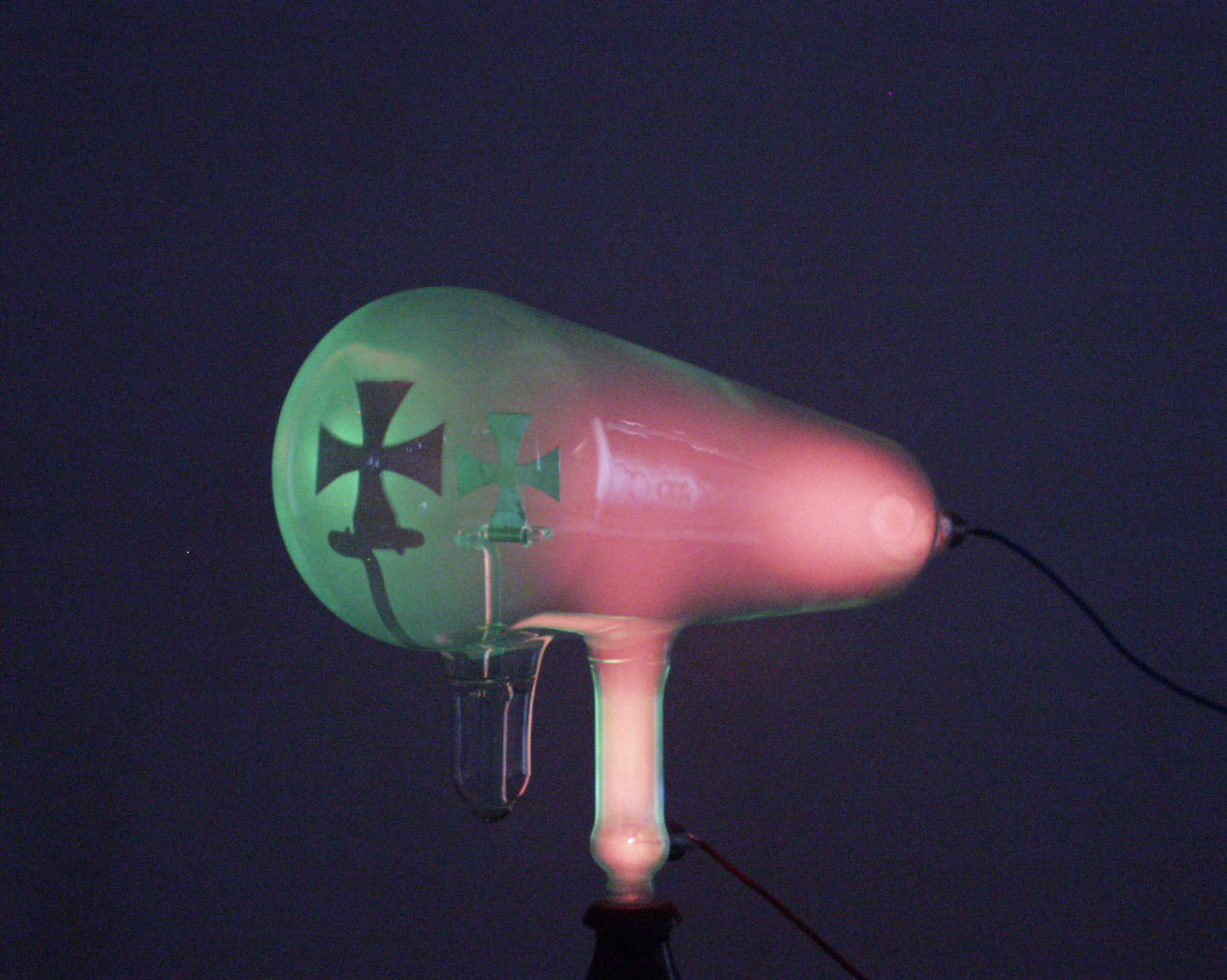
Without magnet, rays travel straight

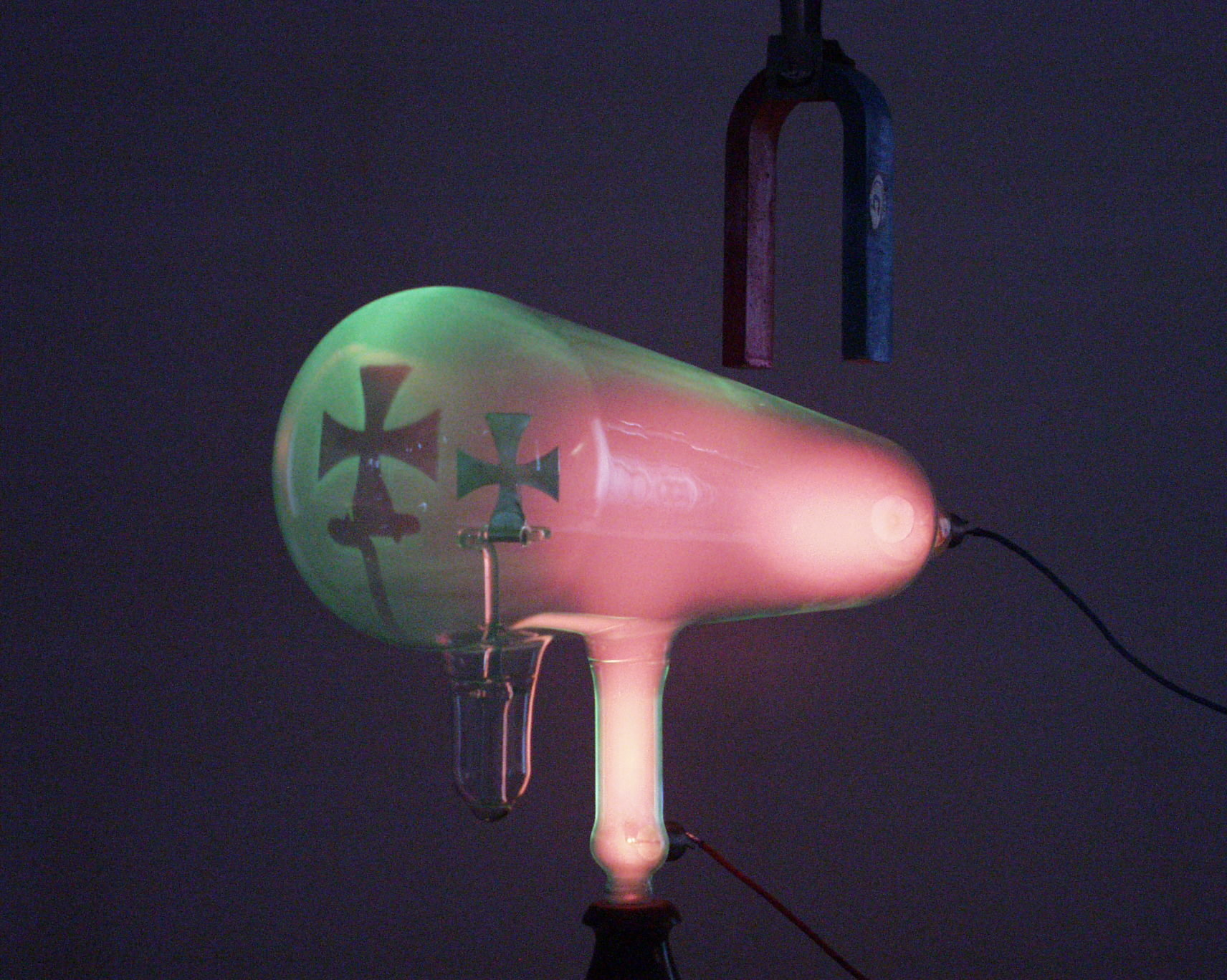
With magnet, rays are bent up

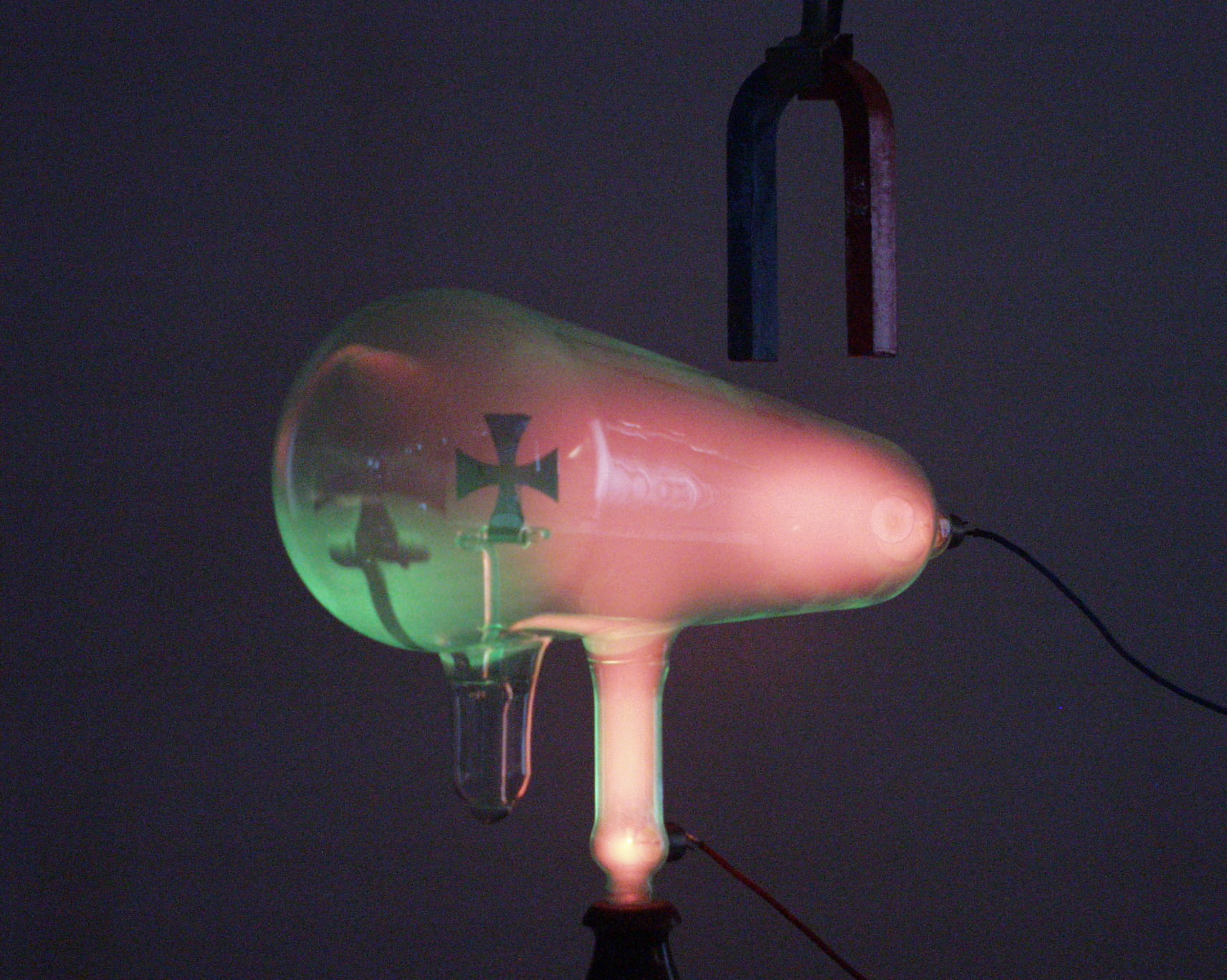
With magnet reversed, rays are bent down

A Crookes tube demonstrating magnetic deflection. With a magnet held at the neck of the tube (right) the rays are bent upward or downward, perpendicular to the horizontal magnetic field, so the green fluorescent patch appears higher or lower. Residual air in the tube glows pink when it is struck by electrons.

=== Paddlewheel ===
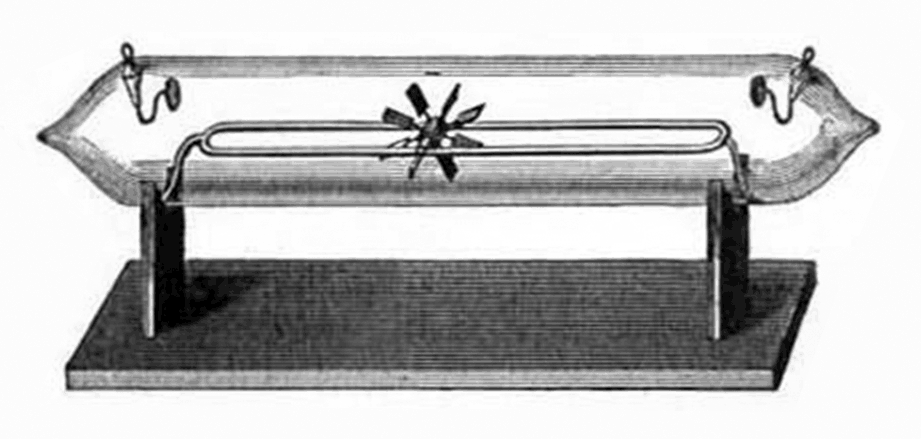
Crookes's paddlewheel tube, from his 1879 paper On Radiant Matter

Crookes put a tiny vaned turbine or paddlewheel in the path of the cathode rays, and found that it rotated when the rays hit it. The paddlewheel turned in a direction away from the cathode side of the tube, suggesting that the force of the cathode rays striking the paddles was causing the rotation. Crookes concluded at the time that this showed that cathode rays had momentum, so the rays were likely matter particles. However, later it was concluded that the paddle wheel turned not due to the momentum of the particles (or electrons) hitting the paddle wheel but due to the radiometric effect. When the rays hit the paddle surface they heated it, and the heat caused the gas next to it to expand, pushing the paddle. This was proven in 1903 by J. J. Thomson who calculated that the momentum of the electrons hitting the paddle wheel would only be sufficient to turn the wheel one revolution per minute. All this experiment really showed was that cathode rays were able to heat surfaces.

=== Electric charge ===
Jean-Baptiste Perrin wanted to determine whether cathode rays actually carried negative charge, or whether they just accompanied the charge carriers, as the Germans thought. In 1895 he constructed a tube with a 'catcher', a closed aluminum cylinder with a small hole in the end facing the cathode, to collect the cathode rays. The catcher was attached to an electroscope to measure its charge. The electroscope showed a negative charge, proving that cathode rays really carry negative electricity.

=== Anode rays ===
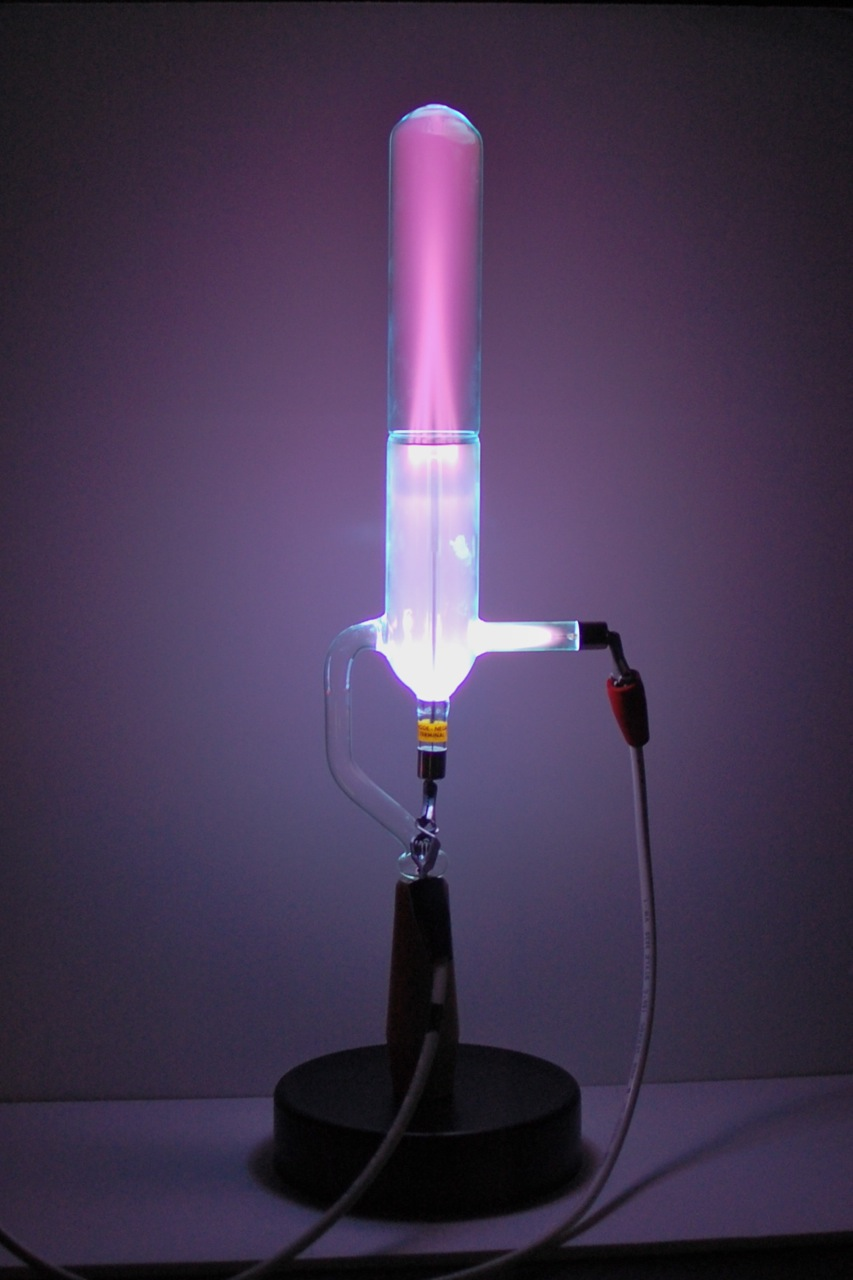
Special tube with perforated cathode, producing anode rays (top, pink)

Goldstein found in 1886 that if the cathode is made with small holes in it, streams of a faint luminous glow will be seen issuing from the holes on the back side of the cathode, facing away from the anode. It was found that in an electric field these anode rays bend in the opposite direction from cathode rays, toward a negatively charged plate, indicating that they carry a positive charge. These were the positive ions which were attracted to the cathode, and created the cathode rays. They were named canal rays (Kanalstrahlen) by Goldstein.

=== Spectral shift ===
Eugen Goldstein thought he had figured out a method of measuring the speed of cathode rays. If the glow discharge seen in the gas of Crookes tubes was produced by the moving cathode rays, the light radiated from them in the direction they were moving, down the tube, would be shifted in frequency due to the Doppler effect. This could be detected with a spectroscope because the emission line spectrum would be shifted. He built a tube shaped like an "L", with a spectroscope pointed through the glass of the elbow down one of the arms. He measured the spectrum of the glow when the spectroscope was pointed toward the cathode end, then switched the power supply connections so the cathode became the anode and the electrons were moving in the other direction, and again observed the spectrum looking for a shift. He did not find one, which he calculated meant that the rays were traveling very slowly. It was later recognized that the glow in Crookes tubes is emitted from gas atoms hit by the electrons, not the electrons themselves. Since the atoms are thousands of times more massive than the electrons, they move much slower, accounting for the lack of Doppler shift.

=== Lenard window ===
Lenard window tube

Philipp Lenard wanted to see if cathode rays could pass out of the Crookes tube into the air. See diagram. He built a tube with a "window" (W) in the glass envelope made of aluminum foil just thick enough to hold the atmospheric pressure out (later called a "Lenard window") facing the cathode (C) so the cathode rays would hit it. He found that something did come through. Holding a fluorescent screen up to the window caused it to fluoresce, even though no light reached it. A photographic plate held up to it would be darkened, even though it was not exposed to light. The effect had a very short range of about 2.5 centimetres (0.98 in). He measured the ability of cathode rays to penetrate sheets of material, and found they could penetrate much farther than moving atoms could. Since atoms were the smallest particles known at the time, this was first taken as evidence that cathode rays were waves. Later it was realized that electrons were much smaller than atoms, accounting for their greater penetration ability.

== See also ==
- Crookes radiometer – 1873 device that rotates when exposed to light
