= List of experiments in physics =

This is a list of notable experiments in physics. The list includes only experiments with Wikipedia articles. For hypothetical experiments, see thought experiment.

== Historical experiments ==
| Date of start | Experiment | Attribution | Type | About |
|---|---|---|---|---|
| 1586 | Delft tower experiment | Simon Stevin and Jan Cornets de Groot | Demonstration | Same mass objects fall at the same speed on Earth |
| 1643 | Torricelli's experiment | Evangelista Torricelli | Demonstration | Vacuum relation to atmospheric pressure |
| 1654 | Magdeburg hemispheres | Otto von Guericke | Demonstration | Atmospheric pressure |
| 1675 | Rømer's determination of the speed of light | Ole Rømer | Measurement | Speed of light |
| 1747 | 's Gravesande's ring | Willem 's Gravesande | Demonstration | Thermal expansion |
| 1752 | Kite experiment | Thomas-François Dalibard/Benjamin Franklin | Investigation | Lightning |
| 1774 | Schiehallion experiment | Nevil Maskelyne | Measurement | Vertical deflection, Earth density |
| 1790 | Pictet's experiment | Marc-Auguste Pictet | Demonstration | Thermal radiation |
| 1797 | Cavendish experiment | Henry Cavendish | Measurement | Gravitational constant |
| 1799 | Voltaic pile | Alessandro Volta | Demonstration | First electric battery |
| 1803 | Young's interference experiment | Thomas Young | Confirmation | Wave theory of light |
| 1804 | Leslie cube | John Leslie | Discovery | Emissivity of surfaces |
| 1819 | Arago spot experiment | François Arago | Confirmation | Fresnel diffraction due to circular object |
| 1838 | Bedford Level experiment | Samuel Rowbotham | Measurement | Curvature of the Earth |
| 1843 | Faraday's ice pail experiment | Michael Faraday | Demonstration | Electromagnetic induction |
| 1850 | Foucault's measurements of the speed of light | Léon Foucault | Measurement | Speed of light |
| 1851 | Fizeau experiment | Hippolyte Fizeau | Measurement | Speed of light |
| 1851 | Foucault pendulum | Léon Foucault | Demonstration | Earth's rotation |
| 1852 | Foucault's gyroscope | Léon Foucault | Demonstration | Earth's rotation |
| 1867 | Kelvin water dropper | Lord Kelvin (William Thomson) | Demonstration | Electrostatic generator |
| 1867 | Tyndall's bar breaker | John Tyndall | Demonstration | Thermal expansion forces |
| 1885 | Eötvös experiment | Loránd Eötvös | Measurement | Ratio between inertial and gravitational mass |
| 1887 | Michelson–Morley experiment | Albert A. Michelson and Edward W. Morley | Negative result | Luminiferous aether |
| 1897 | Thomson experiment | J. J. Thomson | Discovery | Electron |
| 1901 | Trouton–Noble experiment | Frederick Thomas Trouton and H. R. Noble. | Negative result | Luminiferous aether |
| 1901 | Kaufmann–Bucherer–Neumann experiments | Walter Kaufmann, Alfred Bucherer, and others | Investigation | Dependence of the inertial mass of a charge and its velocity |
| 1905 | Rubens tube | Heinrich Rubens | Demonstration | Standing wave |
| 1908 | Geiger–Marsden experiments | Hans Geiger, Ernest Marsden, Ernest Rutherford | Discovery | Atomic nucleus |
| 1909 | Oil drop experiment | Robert A. Millikan and Harvey Fletcher | Measurement | Elementary charge of the electron |
| 1913 | Compton generator | Arthur Compton | Demonstration | Earth's rotation |
| 1914 | Franck–Hertz experiment | James Franck and Gustav Hertz | Confirmation | Bohr model |
| 1914 | Blondel's experiments | André Blondel | Investigation | Electromagnetic induction |
| 1915 | Einstein–de Haas experiment | Albert Einstein and Wander Johannes de Haas | Investigation | Electron magnetic moment |
| 1919 | Eddington experiment | Arthur Eddington | Confirmation | General relativity |
| 1922 | Stern–Gerlach experiment | Otto Stern and Walther Gerlach | Confirmation | Angular momentum quantization |
| 1923 | Davisson–Germer experiment | Clinton Davisson and Lester Germer | Confirmation | De Broglie hypothesis |
| 1924 | Bothe–Geiger coincidence experiment | Walther Bothe and Hans Geiger | Confirmation | Compton effect / conservation of energy |
| 1925 | Michelson–Gale–Pearson experiment | Albert A. Michelson and Henry G. Gale | Measurement | Earth's rotation |
| 1929 | Rüchardt experiment | Eduard Rüchardt | Measurement | Heat capacity ratio |
| 1932 | Kennedy–Thorndike experiment | Roy J. Kennedy and Edward M. Thorndike | Confirmation | Inertial frame invariance of speed of light |
| 1938 | Ives–Stilwell experiment | Herbert E. Ives and G. R. Stilwell | Confirmation | Relativistic Doppler shift |
| 1942 | Chicago Pile-1 | Enrico Fermi | Demonstration | First self-sustaining nuclear chain reaction |
| 1945 | Trinity | Manhattan Project | Demonstration | First nuclear weapon detonation |
| 1947 | Lamb–Retherford experiment | Willis Lamb and Robert Retherford | Discovery | Lamb shift/Vacuum energy |
| 1956 | Wu experiment | Chien-Shiung Wu | Confirmation | Parity violation |
| 1956 | Cowan–Reines neutrino experiment | Clyde Cowan and Frederick Reines | Confirmation | Existence of neutrino |
| 1957 | Goldhaber experiment | Maurice Goldhaber | Confirmation | Neutrino helicity |
| 1958 | Hughes–Drever experiment | Giuseppe Cocconi and Edwin Ernest Salpeter | Confirmation | Lorentz covariance |
| 1959 | Pound–Rebka experiment | Robert Pound and Glen A. Rebka Jr. | Confirmation | Gravitational redshift |
| 1964 | Discovery of cosmic microwave background radiation | Arno Allan Penzias and Robert Woodrow Wilson | Discovery | Cosmic microwave background |
| 1965 | Homestake experiment | Raymond Davis Jr. and John N. Bahcall | Measurement | Count solar neutrinos/solar neutrino problem |
| 1970 | Gargamelle | CERN | Discovery | Neutral currents |
| 1976 | Gravity Probe A | NASA | Measurement | Gravitational time dilation |
| 1977 | De Sitter double star experiment | Kenneth Brecher | Negative result | de Sitter effect |
| 1980 | Aspect's experiment | Alain Aspect | Confirmation | Violation of Bell's inequalities |
| 1981 | UA1 and UA2 experiments | CERN | Discovery | W and Z bosons |
| 1992 | DØ experiment | CERN | Multiple | Top quark |
| 1998 | Delayed-choice quantum eraser | Marlan Scully | Demonstration | Delayed-choice (quantum mechanics) |
| 2004 | Gravity Probe B | NASA/Stanford University | Confirmation | Frame-dragging |
| 2012 | Search for the Higgs boson | CERN | Confirmation | Higgs boson |
| 2015 | First observation of gravitational waves | LIGO | Confirmation | Gravitational waves |

== Articles on several experiments ==
- Bell tests
- BICEP and Keck Array
- Coincidence method
- Discovery of the neutron
- Large Hadron Collider experiments
- List of Super Proton Synchrotron experiments
- Precision tests of QED
- Tests of special relativity
  - Tests of relativistic energy and momentum
  - Modern searches for Lorentz violation
  - Measurements of neutrino speed
- Tests of general relativity
  - Experimental testing of time dilation

== On-going experiments ==
- Collider Detector at Fermilab
- China Dark Matter Experiment
- Cosmic Ray Energetics and Mass Experiment
- General antiparticle spectrometer
- GlueX
- The E and B Experiment
- VIP2 experiment
- VITO experiment

== See also ==
- List of accelerators in particle physics
