= Relativistic aberration =

Change in apparent direction of light rays due to special relativity

In physics, relativistic aberration is the relativistic version of aberration of light, including relativistic corrections that become significant for observers who move with velocities close to the speed of light, as described by special relativity.

Suppose, in the reference frame of the observer, the source is moving with speed v at an angle θ_{s} relative to the vector from the observer to the source at the time when the light is emitted. Then the following formula, which was derived by Albert Einstein in 1905 using Lorentz transformations, describes the aberration of the light source, θ_{o}, measured by the observer:

$$\cos \theta_o = \frac{\cos \theta_s - \dfrac{v}{c}}{1 - \dfrac{v}{c} \cos \theta_s}$$
This expression can also be written in the form
$$\tan\frac{\theta_o}{2} =\sqrt{\frac{1+v/c}{1-v/c}}\tan\frac{\theta_s}{2}$$

In this circumstance, the rays of light from the source which reach the observer are tilted towards the direction of the source's motion (relative to the observer). It is as if light emitted by a moving object is concentrated conically, towards its direction of motion; an effect called relativistic beaming. Also, light received by a moving object (e.g. the view from a very fast spacecraft) also appears concentrated towards its direction of motion.

== Searchlight effect ==
A consequence is that a forward observer should normally be expected to intercept a greater proportion of the object's light than a rearward one; this concentration of light in the object's forward direction is referred to as the "searchlight" or "headlight" effect. Light from a relativistic source becomes more forward directed and Doppler shifted with increasing velocity ($\beta=v/\mathrm{c}$).

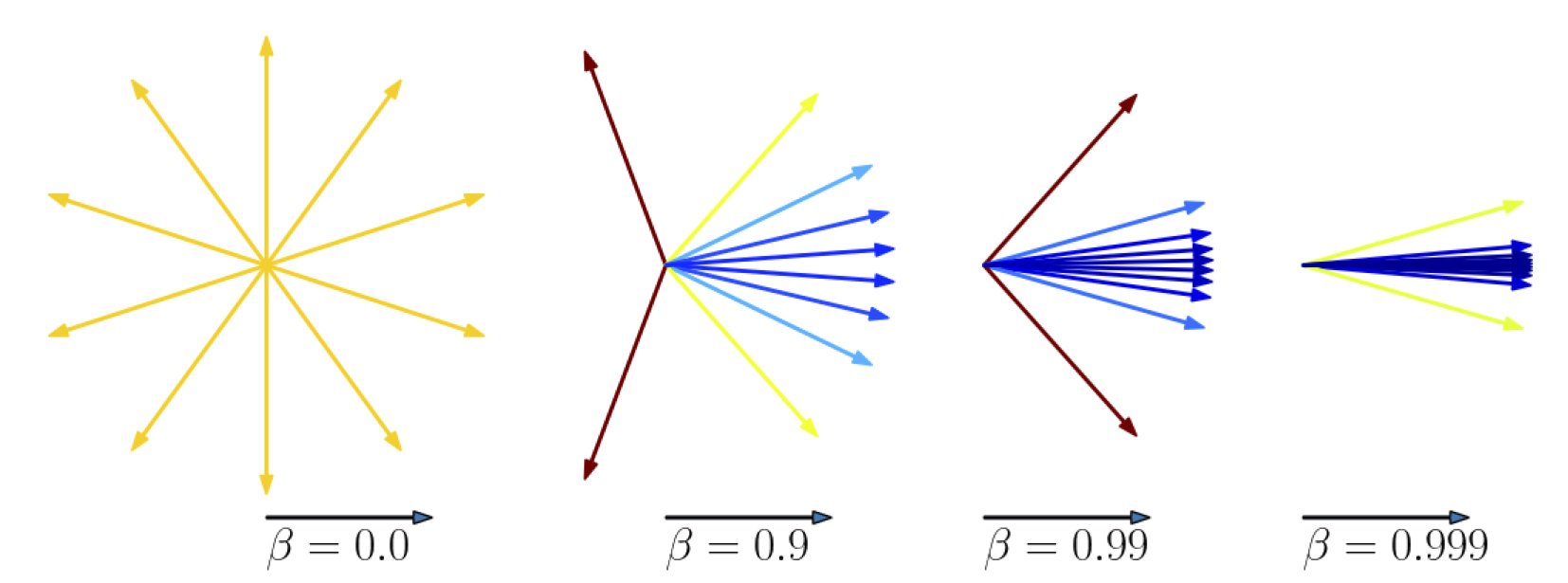

== See also ==
- Relativistic beaming
- Aberration redshift
- Doppler effect
- Relativistic Doppler effect
- Ives–Stilwell experiment
- Time dilation
- Aberration (astronomy)
