= Emil Rupp =

German physicist (1898–1979)

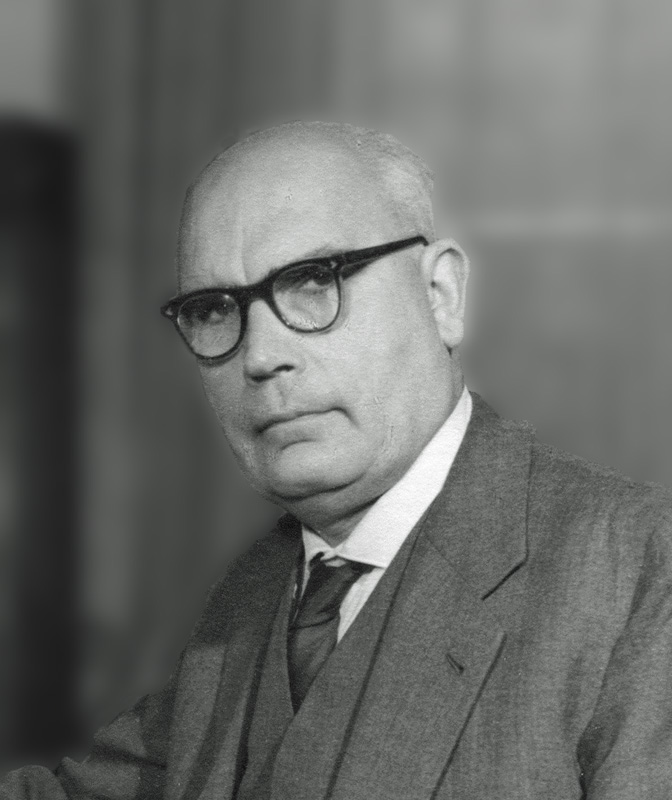
- Born: 1 July 1898
- Died: 10 April 1979 (aged 80)

Philipp Heinrich Emil Rupp (1 July 1898 – 10 April 1979) was a German physicist, regarded by many as a respectable and important experimentalist in the late 1920s. He was later forced to recant all five of the papers he had published in 1935, admitting that his findings and experiments had been fictions. There is evidence that most if not all of his earlier experimental results were forged as well.

== Canal ray experiments ==
In 1926 Rupp's canal ray experiments seemed to corroborate Albert Einstein's theories on wave–particle duality. He published these results in a paper that was printed next to a theoretical paper on the same subject by Einstein, who evidently accepted Rupp's alleged findings as confirming his (Einstein's) theoretical model. Rupp's experimental results were later shown to have been falsified (although subsequent experimental work re-confirmed Einstein's model).

== Exposure of fraud ==
Although the validity of Rupp's experimental results had been challenged by other workers in the field repeatedly throughout his career, it was not until 1935 that his misdeeds were fully exposed. In 1935 experimentalists Walther Gerlach and Eduard Rüchardt published a corrected version of Einstein's mirror diagram in an article that argued that Rupp had falsely claimed to have carried out the rotated mirror experiment. Some fellow physicists at the AEG labs grew suspicious of Rupp when he claimed having accelerated protons at 500 kV, something he could not have the technical facilities to achieve. Rupp had to publicly retract five publications from the previous year. He attached a psychiatric diagnosis by Dr. Emil von Gebsattel that said he had written them under the influence of "dreamlike states" caused by psychasthenia. Rupp never worked again as a physicist, and all other physicists ceased to refer to any of his alleged results.

== See also ==
- List of experimental errors and frauds in physics
