= Eduard Rüchardt =

German physicist

- Born: 29 March 1888; Moscow, Russian Empire
- Died: 7 March 1962 (aged 73); Munich, West Germany
- Education: University of Würzburg
- Known for: Rüchardt Experiment canal rays
- Awards: o. Mitgl. d. Bayer. Ak. d. Wiss. (1946).
- Scientific career
- Fields: Physics
- Workplaces: Ludwig-Maximilians-Universität München
- Doctoral advisor: Wilhelm Wien
- Doctoral students: Heinz Billing

Eduard Rüchardt (March 29, 1888 – March 7, 1962) was a German physicist. In modern times Rüchardt is mainly noted for the experiment named after him. However, Rüchardt's chief topic was the study of canal rays. This work started under the supervision of Wilhelm Wien and continued later in collaborations with Walther Gerlach.

== Life and work ==
After home-schooling in Moscow, Rüchardt visited the Vitztumsche secondary school in Dresden from 1905 on. He started studying physics at the University of Jena in 1908 and continued at the University of Freiburg and the University of Würzburg in 1910. There he worked towards his doctor's degree under Wilhelm Wien. The topic of his thesis was "Excitation of phosphorescence through canal rays".

In 1920, Rüchardt followed Wien to the Ludwig-Maximilians-Universität München to be his assistant. In 1922, he published "processes of charge reversal in hydrogen canal rays" to gain his professorship. There he taught as an associate professor from 1924 to 1946 and from 1946 to 1955 as a tenured professor. Rüchardt's chief topic under Wien was about the physics of canal rays. For the first time the problem of light excitation of phosphors by solid canal rays was observed by energy considerations. Besides the processes of charge reversal in hydrogen canal rays, Rüchardt examined the correlation of neutralization and coverage for secondary radiation canal rays and α-rays. With the interaction of matter with canal rays Rüchardt was able to formulate extensive statements on the construction and properties of atoms. This way he succeeded in finding definite evidence of oxygen isotope 18O.

In the 1930s, many dissertations supervised by Rüchardt discussed canal rays. The research included Einstein's rotating mirror experiment (Spiegel-drehversuch) and the Transverse Doppler effect. The work done with Walther Gerlach in 1926 received particular acclaim. The great wars greatly influenced his academic focus. He developed specific amplifier valves in World War I. During World War II Rüchardt researched the mode of operation for electrical contacts. These last works shifted to his focus of his research after 1945. It ranged from works (with numerous scholars) on dependency of resistance of contact load up to superconduction of contacts.

== Legacy and Notability ==
Rüchardt was instrumental in the exposure of the fraudulent results presented by Emil Rupp. He wrote an abstract for the Physikalische Berichte that pointed out that Rupp's vacuum pump appeared in the wrong location. From this he showed that obtaining the kind of freely decaying atoms that Rupp had claimed to do in his experiments would have been impossible. In 1935, following Rupp's fall from grace and in the midst of the controversy over what elements of his work could be trusted, Rüchardt and Walther Gerlach published a short note in the Annalen der Physik in which they made very clear that Rupp had confirmed a mistakenly drawn diagram by Albert Einstein. This is generally considered to be the point when Rupp lost all credibility.

Rüchardt's lectures about "Higher Experimental Physics" were exemplary. The experiments demonstrated in the lecture were revised and modernized constantly. He successfully strove for accurate depictions of modern physics in popular culture, as well as the introduction of physical evidence and scientific methods in medicine.

The Rüchardt experiment was developed over the years in his lectures. It is now performed as a standard experiment for thermodynamics in several universities, such as UBC, Bayreuth and UCLA.

== Works and Literature ==
- Weitere W Durchgang v. Kanalstrahlen durch Materie, in: Hdb. d. Physik, hg. v. H. Geiger u. K. Scheel, 21933, XXII/2, S. 75–154; Sichtbares u. unsichtbares Licht, 1938 (Neudr. 1952, auch span., engl., poln. u. ungar. Übers.).
- E. Kappler, in: Physikal. Bll. 4, 1948, S. 211; W. Gerlach, ebd. 14, 1958, S. 129; ders., in: Jb. d. Bayer. Ak. d. Wiss. 1962, S. 189-95 (P); J. Brandmüller. Das wiss. Werk v. E. R., in: Dt. Mus. München, Wiss. Jb. 1991, S. 7-24 (W-Verz., P); Pogg. VI, VII a.
