= Relativistic beaming =

Change in luminosity of a moving object due to special relativity

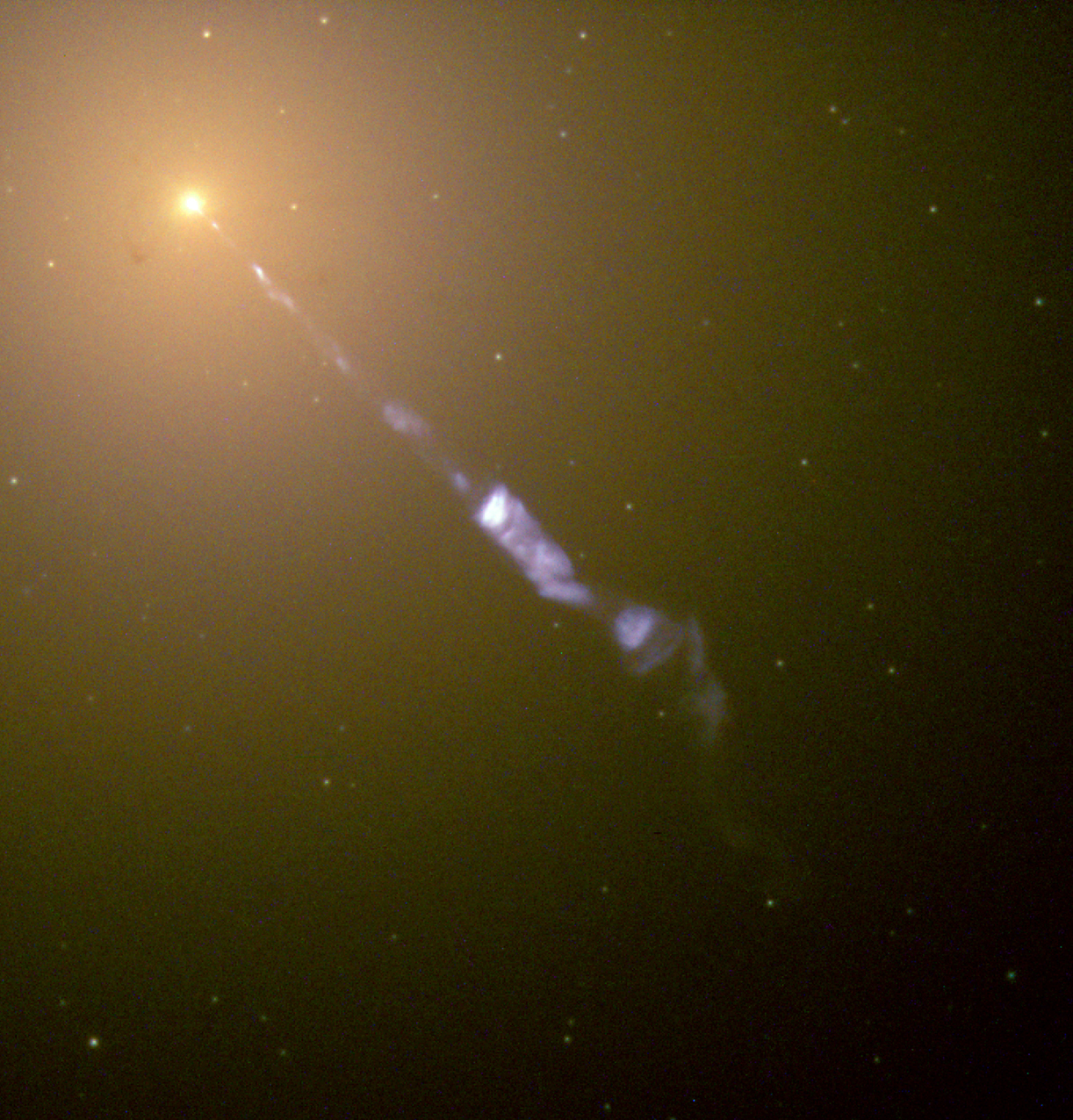
Only a single jet is visible in M87.

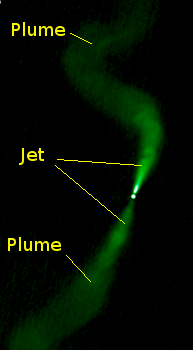
Two jets are visible in 3C 31.

In physics, relativistic beaming (also known as Doppler beaming, Doppler boosting, or the headlight effect) is the process by which relativistic effects modify the apparent luminosity of matter that is moving at speeds close to the speed of light. Relativistic beaming causes matter moving towards an observer—for example, a telescope on Earth—to appear brighter than matter moving away, even when there is no intrinsic difference in the luminosities. In an astronomical context, relativistic beaming commonly occurs in two oppositely directed relativistic jets of plasma that originate from a central compact object that is accreting matter. Accreting compact objects with relativistic jets explain phenomena such as X-ray binaries, gamma-ray bursts, and, on a much larger scale, active galactic nuclei (AGN; of which quasars are a particular variety).

Beaming affects the apparent brightness of a moving object. If an object emitting electromagnetic radiation moves towards the observer, it will be brighter than if it were at rest, but it is moving away, it will appear fainter. The magnitude of the effect is illustrated by the AGN jets of the galaxies M87 and 3C 31 (see images at right). M87 has twin jets aimed almost directly towards and away from Earth, so Doppler beaming is extreme; the jet moving towards Earth is clearly visible (the long, thin blueish feature in the top image at right), while the other jet is so much fainter it is not visible. In 3C 31, both jets (labeled in the lower figure at right) are roughly perpendicular to the Earth's line of sight, and thus, both are visible. The upper jet points slightly more in Earth's direction and is therefore brighter.

Relativistically, moving objects are beamed due to a variety of physical effects. Light aberration causes most of the photons to be emitted along the object's direction of motion. The Doppler effect changes the energy of the photons by red- or blue-shifting them. Finally, time dilation affects the rate at which photons arrive on Earth. How all of these effects modify the brightness, or apparent luminosity, of a moving object is determined by the equation describing the relativistic Doppler effect (which is why relativistic beaming is also known as Doppler beaming).

== A simple jet model ==
The simplest model for a jet is one where a single, homogeneous sphere is travelling towards the Earth at nearly the speed of light. This simple model is also an unrealistic one, but it illustrates the physical process of beaming.

=== Synchrotron spectrum and the spectral index ===
Relativistic jets emit most of their energy via synchrotron emission. In our simple model, the sphere contains highly relativistic electrons and a steady magnetic field. Electrons inside the blob travel at speeds a tiny fraction below the speed of light and are whipped around by the magnetic field. Each change in direction by an electron is accompanied by the release of energy in the form of a photon. With enough electrons and a powerful enough magnetic field, the relativistic sphere can emit a huge number of photons, ranging from those at relatively weak radio frequencies to powerful X-ray photons.

Features of a simple synchrotron spectrum include, at low frequencies, the jet sphere is opaque and its luminosity increases with frequency until it peaks and begins to decline. This peak frequency occurs at $\log \nu = 3$. At frequencies higher than this, the jet sphere is transparent. The luminosity decreases with frequency until a break frequency is reached, after which it declines more rapidly. The break frequency occurs when $\log \nu = 7$. The sharp break frequency occurs because at very high frequencies, the electrons which emit the photons lose most of their energy rapidly. A sharp decrease in the number of high energy electrons means a sharp decrease in the spectrum.

The changes in slope in the synchrotron spectrum are parameterized with a spectral index. The spectral index, α, over a given frequency range is simply the slope on a diagram of $\log S$ vs. $\log \nu$. (Of course for α to have real meaning the spectrum must be very nearly a straight line across the range in question.)

=== Beaming equation ===
In the simple jet model of a single homogeneous sphere the observed luminosity is related to the intrinsic luminosity as

$$S_o = S_e D^p\,,$$

where
$$p = 3 - \alpha\,.$$

The observed luminosity therefore depends on the speed of the jet and the angle to the line of sight through the Doppler factor, $D$, and also on the properties inside the jet, as shown by the exponent with the spectral index.

The beaming equation can be broken down into a series of three effects:

- Relativistic aberration
- Time dilation
- Blue- or redshifting

==== Aberration ====
Aberration is the change in an object's apparent direction caused by the relative transverse motion of the observer. In inertial systems it is equal and opposite to the light time correction.

In everyday life aberration is a well-known phenomenon. Consider a person standing in the rain on a day when there is no wind. If the person is standing still, then the rain drops will follow a path that is straight down to the ground. However, if the person is moving, for example in a car, the rain will appear to be approaching at an angle. This apparent change in the direction of the incoming raindrops is aberration.

The amount of aberration depends on the speed of the emitted object or wave relative to the observer. In the example above this would be the speed of a car compared to the speed of the falling rain. This does not change when the object is moving at a speed close to $c$. Like the classic and relativistic effects, aberration depends on: 1) the speed of the emitter at the time of emission, and 2) the speed of the observer at the time of absorption.

In the case of a relativistic jet, beaming (emission aberration) will make it appear as if more energy is sent forward, along the direction the jet is traveling. In the simple jet model a homogeneous sphere will emit energy equally in all directions in the rest frame of the sphere. In the rest frame of Earth the moving sphere will be observed to be emitting most of its energy along its direction of motion. The energy, therefore, is ‘beamed’ along that direction.

Quantitatively, aberration accounts for a change in luminosity of

$$D^2.$$

==== Time dilation ====
Time dilation is a well-known consequence of special relativity and accounts for a change in observed luminosity of
$$D^1.$$

==== Blue- or redshifting ====
Blue- or redshifting can change the observed luminosity at a particular frequency, but this is not a beaming effect.

Blueshifting accounts for a change in observed luminosity of

$$\frac{1}{D^\alpha}.$$

==== Lorentz invariants ====
A more-sophisticated method of deriving the beaming equations starts with the quantity $\frac{S}{\nu^3}$. This quantity is a Lorentz invariant, so the value is the same in different reference frames.

== Terminology ==
beamed, beaming
shorter terms for ‘relativistic beaming’
beta
the ratio of the jet speed to the speed of light, sometimes called ‘relativistic beta’
core
region of a galaxy around the central black hole
counter-jet
the jet on the far side of a source oriented close to the line of sight, can be very faint and difficult to observe
Doppler factor
a mathematical expression which measures the strength (or weakness) of relativistic effects in AGN, including beaming, based on the jet speed and its angle to the line of sight with Earth
flat spectrum
a term for a non-thermal spectrum that emits a great deal of energy at the higher frequencies when compared to the lower frequencies
intrinsic luminosity
the luminosity from the jet in the rest frame of the jet
jet (often termed 'relativistic jet')
a high velocity (close to c) stream of plasma emanating from the polar direction of an AGN
observed luminosity
the luminosity from the jet in the rest frame of Earth
spectral index
a measure of how a non-thermal spectrum changes with frequency. The smaller α is, the more significant the energy at higher frequencies is. Typically α is in the range of 0 to 2.
steep spectrum
a term for a non-thermal spectrum that emits little energy at the higher frequencies when compared to the lower frequencies

=== Physical quantities ===
angle to the line-of-sight with Earth
$$\theta$$
jet speed
$$v_j$$
intrinsic luminosity
$S_e$ (sometimes called emitted luminosity)
observed Luminosity
$$S_o$$
spectral index
$\alpha$ where $S \propto \nu^{\alpha}$
Speed of light
$c =$ 2.9979×10^{8} m/s

=== Mathematical expressions ===
relativistic beta
$$\beta = \frac{v_j}{c}$$
Lorentz factor
$$\gamma = \frac{1}{\sqrt{1 - \beta^2}}$$
Doppler factor
$$D = \frac{1}{\gamma (1 - \beta \cos\theta)}$$

== See also ==
- Astrophysical jet
- Relativistic Doppler effect
- Relativistic particle
- Relativistic plasma
- Relativistic similarity parameter
- Relativistic wave equations
