= Rüchardt experiment =

Thermodynamics experiment

The Rüchardt experiment, invented by Eduard Rüchardt, is a famous experiment in thermodynamics, which determines the ratio of the molar heat capacities of a gas, i.e. the ratio of $C_\text{p}$ (heat capacity at constant pressure) and $C_\text{V}$ (heat capacity at constant volume) and is denoted by $\gamma$ (gamma, for ideal gas) or $\kappa$ (kappa, isentropic exponent, for real gas). It arises because the temperature of a gas changes as pressure changes.

The experiment directly yields the heat capacity ratio or adiabatic index of the gas, which is the ratio of the heat capacity at constant pressure to heat capacity at constant volume. The results are sometimes also known as the isentropic expansion factor.

== Background ==
If a gas is compressed adiabatically, i.e. without outflow of heat from the system, the temperature rises (due to the pressure increase) at a higher rate with respect to isothermal compression, where the performed work is dissipated as heat. The exponent, $\kappa$, with which the expansion of the gas can be calculated by the application of heat is called the isentropic – or adiabatic coefficient. Its value is determined by the Rüchardt experiment.

An adiabatic and reversible running state change is isentropic (entropy S remains the same as temperature T changes). The technique is usually an adiabatic change of state. For example, a steam turbine is not isentropic, as friction, choke and shock processes produce entropy.

== Experiment ==
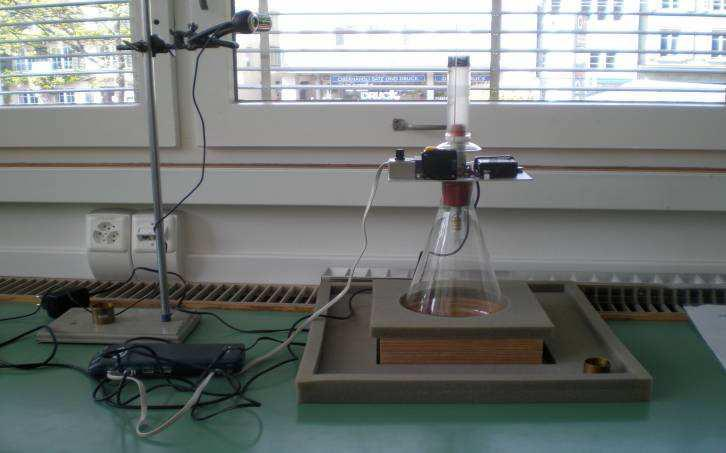
Rüchardt experiment, Glass vessel with piston and Logger Pro P,V,T sensors

A typical experiment, consists of a glass tube of volume V, and of cross-section A, which is open on one of its end. A ball (or sometimes a piston) of mass m with the same cross-section, creating an air-tight seal, is allowed to fall under gravity g. The entrapped gas is first compressed by the weight of the piston, which leads to an increase in temperature. In the course of the piston falling, a gas cushion is created, and the piston bounces. Harmonic oscillation occurs, which slowly damps. The result is a rapid sequence of expansion and compression of the gas. The picture shows a revised version of the original Rüchardt setup: the sphere oscillating inside the tube is here replaced by a "breast-pump" which acts as an oscillating glass-piston; in this new setup three sensors allow to measure in real-time the piston oscillations as well as the pressure and temperature oscillations of the air inside the bottle (more details may be found in)

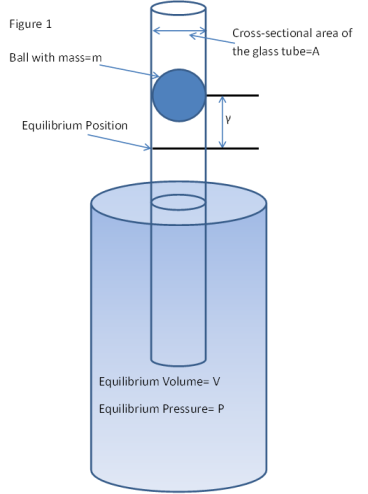
Conceptual diagram of the experiment.

According to Figure 1, the piston inside the tube is in equilibrium if the pressure P inside the glass bottle is equal to the sum of the atmospheric pressure P_{0} and the pressure increase due to the piston weight :

$P = P_0 + \frac{mg}{A}$	Eq. 1

When the piston moves beyond the equilibrium by a distance dx, the pressure changes by dp. A force F will be exerted on the piston, equal to

$F = A \mathrm{d}P$	Eq. 2

According to Newton's second law of motion, this force will create an acceleration a equal to

$a = \frac{\mathrm{d}^2x}{\mathrm{d}t^2} = \frac{A}{m}\mathrm{d}P$	Eq. 3

As this process is adiabatic, the equation for ideal gas (Poisson's equation) is:

$P V^\gamma = \mathrm{constant}$	Eq. 4

It follows using differentiation from the equation above that:

$V^\gamma \mathrm{d}P + \gamma P V^{\gamma-1} \mathrm{d}V = 0$	Eq. 5a

$\mathrm{d}P = - \frac{\gamma P}{V} \mathrm{d}V$	Eq. 5b

If the piston moves by a distance $d x$ in the glass tube, the corresponding change in volume will be

$\mathrm{d}V=A dx$	Eq. 6

By substituting equation Eq. 5b into equation Eq. 3, we can rewrite Eq. 3 as follows:

$\frac{\mathrm{d}^2 x}{\mathrm{d} t^2} + \frac{\gamma P A^2}{m V}x = 0$	Eq. 7

Solving this equation and rearranging terms yields the differential equation of a harmonic oscillation from which the angular frequency ω can be deduced:

$\omega = \sqrt{\frac{\gamma P A^2}{m V}}$	Eq. 8

From this, the period T of harmonic oscillation performed by the ball is:

$T = \frac{2 \pi}{\omega} = 2 \pi \sqrt \frac{m V}{\gamma P {A}^2 }$	Eq. 9

Measuring the period of oscillation T and the relative pressure P in the tube yields the equation for the adiabatic exponent:

${\gamma}=\frac{4 \pi^2 m V}{A^2 P T^2}$	Eq. 10

== List of various versions of the Rüchardt experiment ==
- In 1929, Rinkel proposed a different method to calculate $\gamma$ while using the Rüchardt apparatus: he noted that it may be shown that the vertical distance L which the sphere falls before it begin to rise is: $L=\frac {2mgV}{PA^2\gamma}$, so $\gamma$ may be calculated from measured values of L, m, V, P and A.
- In 1951, Koehler and later, in 1972 Flammersfeld introduced a trick in the original Rüchardt setup, to increase the number of oscillations that are limited by the unavoidable friction-damping and gas leak (through the piston-tube seal): they made a thin hole on the tube (at half-height) and provided a gas-feeding pump to keep the pressure inside the vessel constant. By properly trimming the gas inlet flux (through a throttling valve) they obtained the following result: during the oscillations the piston is pushed-up by the gas overpressure until it crosses the hole position; then the gas leakage through the hole reduces the pressure, and the piston falls back. The force acting onto the piston varies at a rate that is regulated by the piston oscillation frequency leading to forced oscillation; fine adjustment of the throttle valve allows to achieve maximum amplitude at resonance.
- In 1958, Christy and Rieser used only a gas-feeding pump to stabilize the gas pressure. A slightly different solution was found in 1964 by Hafner who used a tapered tube (conical: slightly larger at the top).
- In 1959, Taylor used a column of mercury oscillating inside a U-shaped tube instead of the Rüchardt sphere.
- In 1964, Donnally and Jensen used a variable load attached to the Rüchardt sphere in order to allows frequency measurements with different oscillating mass.
- In 1967, Lerner suggested a modified version of the Taylor method (with mercury replaced by water).
- In 1979, Smith reported a simplified version of the complex Rüchardt-resonance method, originally invented by Clark and Katz, in which an oscillating magnetic piston is driven into resonance by an external coil.
- In 1988, Connolly suggested the use of a photogate to measure more precisely the frequency of the Rüchardt sphere.
- In 2001, Severn and Steffensen used a pressure transducer to monitor the pressure oscillations in the original Rüchardt setup.
- In 2001, Torzo, Delfitto, Pecori and Scatturin implemented the version of Rüchardt apparatus (shown in the top picture) using three sensors: a sonar that monitors the breast-pump oscillations, and pressure and temperature sensors that monitor the changes in pressure and temperature inside the glass vessel.
