= Differential Doppler effect =

The Differential Doppler effect occurs when light is emitted from a rotating source.

In circumstellar environments it describes the difference in photons arriving at orbiting dust particles. Photons that originate from the limb that is rotating away from the particle are red-shifted, while photons emitted from the limb rotating toward the particle are blue-shifted.

== See also ==
- Yarkovsky effect
- Poynting–Robertson effect
- Radiation pressure
- Doppler effect
