= Doppler effect =

Frequency change of a wave for observer relative to its source

Change of wavelength caused by motion of the source

An animation illustrating how the Doppler effect causes a car engine or siren to sound higher in pitch when it is approaching than when it is receding. The red circles represent sound waves. Passing car horn

The Doppler effect (also Doppler shift) is the change in the frequency or, equivalently, the period of a wave in relation to an observer who is moving relative to the source of the wave. It is named after Christian Doppler, who described the phenomenon in 1842. A common example of a Doppler shift is the change of pitch heard when a vehicle approaches and recedes from an observer. Compared to the emitted sound, the received sound has a higher pitch during the approach, identical at the instant of passing by, and lower pitch during the recession.

When the source of the sound wave is moving towards the observer, each successive cycle of the wave is emitted from a position closer to the observer than the previous cycle. Hence, from the observer's perspective, the period or time between cycles is reduced, meaning the frequency is increased. Conversely, if the source of the sound wave is moving away from the observer, each cycle of the wave is emitted from a position farther from the observer than the previous cycle, so the period or time between successive cycles is increased, thus reducing the frequency.

For waves propagating in a vacuum, as is possible for electromagnetic waves or gravitational waves, only the relative velocity between the observer and the source needs to be considered. For waves that propagate in a medium, such as sound waves, the velocity of the observer and of the source are relative to the medium in which the waves are transmitted. The total Doppler effect in such cases may therefore result from motion of the source, motion of the observer, motion of the medium, or any combination thereof.

== History ==
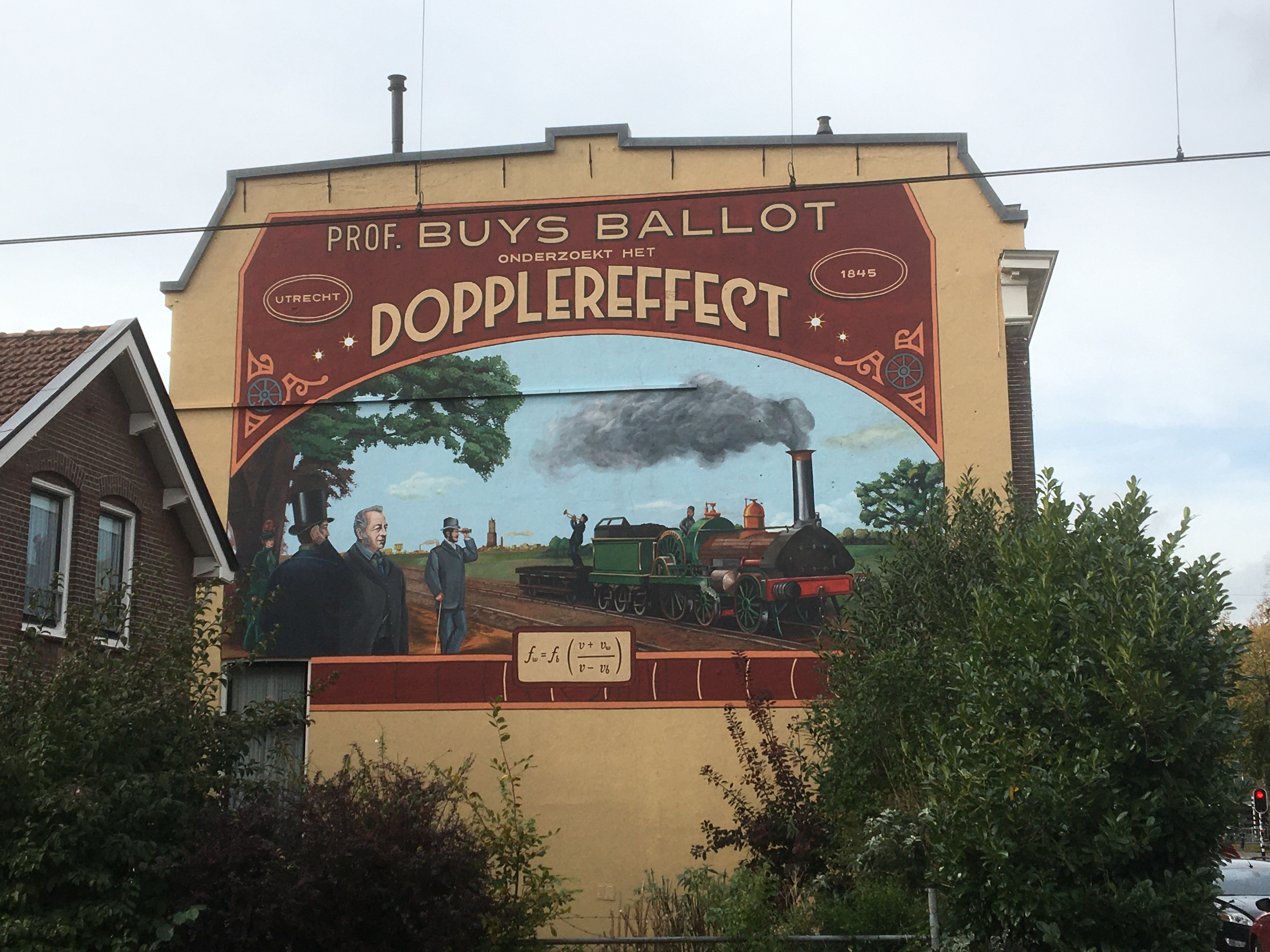
Experiment by Buys Ballot (1845) depicted on a wall in Utrecht (2019)

Doppler first proposed this effect in 1842 in his treatise "Über das farbige Licht der Doppelsterne und einiger anderer Gestirne des Himmels" (translating to: "On the Coloured Light of the Double Stars and Certain Other Stars of the Heavens"). The hypothesis was tested for sound waves by Buys Ballot in 1845. He confirmed that the sound's pitch was higher than the emitted frequency when the sound source approached him, and lower than the emitted frequency when the sound source receded from him. Hippolyte Fizeau independently discovered the same phenomenon on electromagnetic waves in 1848. In France, the effect is sometimes called "effet Doppler-Fizeau" but that name was not adopted by the rest of the world as Fizeau's discovery was six years after Doppler's proposal. (Note: Fizeau: "Acoustique et optique". Lecture, Société Philomathique de Paris, 29 December 1848. According to Becker(pg. 109), this was never published, but recounted by M. Moigno(1850): "Répertoire d'optique moderne" (in French), vol 3. pp 1165–1203 and later in full by Fizeau, "Des effets du mouvement sur le ton des vibrations sonores et sur la longeur d'onde des rayons de lumière"; [Paris, 1870]. Annales de Chimie et de Physique, 19, 211–221.) In Britain, John Scott Russell made an experimental study of the Doppler effect (1848).

== General ==
The relationship between observed frequency $f$ and emitting frequency $f_\text{0}$ of a wave propagating through a medium is given by:
$$f = \left( \frac{v_\text{m} \pm v_\text{r}}{v_\text{m} \mp v_\text{s}} \right) f_0$$
where

- $v_\text{m}$ is the propagation speed of the wave in the medium;
- $v_\text{r}$ is the speed of the wave receiver relative to the medium. In the formula, $v_\text{r}$ is added to $v_\text{m}$ if the receiver is moving towards the source, and subtracted if moving away;
- $v_\text{s}$ is the speed of the wave source relative to the medium. In the formula, $v_\text{s}$ is subtracted from $v_\text{m}$ if the source is moving towards the receiver, and added if moving away.

$v_\text{m}$, $v_\text{r}$, and $v_\text{s}$ here are not vectors as velocities, but their magnitudes as speeds. This relationship predicts that the observed frequency by the receiver will decrease if the distance between the source and receiver is increasing. Note that the speed of the wave is determined by the medium, not by the speed of the source.

If the source approaches the observer at an angle (but still with a constant speed), the observed frequency that is first heard is higher than the object's emitted frequency. Thereafter, there is a monotonic decrease in the observed frequency as it gets closer to the observer, through equality when it is coming from a direction perpendicular to the relative motion (and was emitted at the point of closest approach; but when the wave is received, the source and observer will no longer be at their closest), and a continued monotonic decrease as it recedes from the observer. When the observer is very close to the path of the object, the transition from high to low frequency is very abrupt. When the observer is far from the path of the object, the transition from high to low frequency is gradual.

Stationary sound source produces sound waves at a constant frequency f, and the wave-fronts propagate symmetrically away from the source at a constant speed c. The distance between wave-fronts is the wavelength. All observers will hear the same frequency, which will be equal to the actual frequency of the source where f = f_{0}.

The same sound source is radiating sound waves at a constant frequency in the same medium. However, now the sound source is moving with a speed υ_{s} = 0.7 c. Since the source is moving, the center of each new wavefront is now slightly displaced to the right. As a result, the wave-fronts begin to bunch up on the right side (in front of) and spread further apart on the left side (behind) of the source. An observer in front of the source will hear a higher frequency f = (c + 0)/(c – 0.7c) f_{0} = 3.33 f_{0} and an observer behind the source will hear a lower frequency f = (c − 0)/(c + 0.7c) f_{0} = 0.59 f_{0}.

Now the source is moving at the speed of sound in the medium (υ_{s} = c). The wave fronts in front of the source are now all bunched up at the same point. As a result, an observer in front of the source will detect nothing until the source arrives and an observer behind the source will hear a lower frequency f = (c – 0)/(c + c) f_{0} = 0.5 f_{0}.

The sound source has now surpassed the speed of sound in the medium, and is traveling at 1.4 c. Since the source is moving faster than the sound waves it creates, it actually leads the advancing wavefront. The sound source will pass by a stationary observer before the observer hears the sound. As a result, an observer in front of the source will detect nothing and an observer behind the source will hear a lower frequency f = (c – 0)/(c + 1.4c) f_{0} = 0.42 f_{0}.

== Consequences ==
Assuming a stationary observer and a wave source moving towards the observer at (or exceeding) the speed of the wave, the Doppler equation predicts an infinite (or negative) frequency as from the observer's perspective. Thus, the Doppler equation is inapplicable for such cases. If the wave is a sound wave and the sound source is moving faster than the speed of sound, the resulting shock wave creates a sonic boom.

Lord Rayleigh predicted the following effect in his classic book on sound: if the observer were moving from the (stationary) source at twice the speed of sound, a musical piece previously emitted by that source would be heard in correct tempo and pitch, but as if played backwards.

== Applications ==
=== Sirens ===
Sirens on passing emergency vehicles

A siren on a passing emergency vehicle will start out higher than its stationary pitch, slide down as it passes, and continue lower than its stationary pitch as it recedes from the observer. Astronomer John Dobson explained the effect thus:

The reason the siren slides is because it doesn't hit you.

In other words, if the siren approached the observer directly, the pitch would remain constant, at a higher than stationary pitch, until the vehicle hit them, and then immediately jump to a new lower pitch. Because the vehicle passes by the observer, the radial speed does not remain constant, but instead varies as a function of the angle between his line of sight and the siren's velocity:
$$v_\text{radial} = v_\text{s}  \cos(\theta)$$
where $\theta$ is the angle between the object's forward velocity and the line of sight from the object to the observer.

=== Astronomy ===
Redshift of spectral lines in the optical spectrum of a supercluster of distant galaxies (right), as compared to that of the Sun (left)

The Doppler effect for electromagnetic waves such as light is of widespread use in astronomy to measure the speed at which stars and galaxies are approaching or receding from us, resulting in so called blueshift or redshift, respectively. This may be used to detect if an apparently single star is, in reality, a close binary, to measure the rotational speed of stars and galaxies, or to detect exoplanets. This effect typically happens on a very small scale; there would not be a noticeable difference in visible light to the unaided eye. The use of the Doppler effect in astronomy depends on knowledge of precise frequencies of discrete lines in the spectra of stars.

The relationship between the expansion of the universe and the Doppler effect is not simply caused by the source moving away from the observer. In cosmology, the redshift of expansion is considered separate from redshifts due to gravity or Doppler motion.

Distant galaxies also exhibit peculiar motion distinct from their cosmological recession speeds. If redshifts are used to determine distances in accordance with Hubble's law, then these peculiar motions give rise to redshift-space distortions.

=== Radar ===
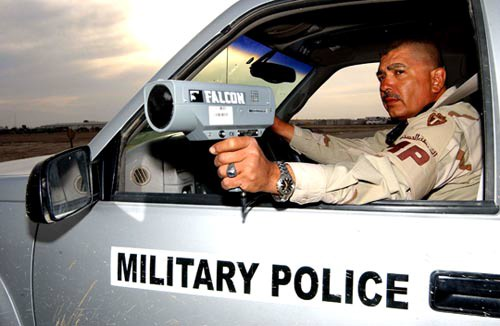
U.S. Military Police using a radar gun, an application of Doppler radar, to catch speeding violators

The Doppler effect is used in some types of radar to measure the velocity of detected objects. A radar beam is fired at a moving target – e.g. a motor car, as police use radar to detect speeding motorists – as it approaches to or recedes from the radar source. In the case of a car moving away from the source, each successive radar wave has to travel farther to reach the car, before being reflected and re-detected near the source. As each wave has to move farther, the gaps between the wave crests increase, increasing the wavelength of the radiation returning to the radar. In the opposite case, when the radar beam is fired at the moving car as it approaches, each successive wave travels a lesser distance, decreasing the wavelength. In either situation, calculations from the Doppler effect accurately determine the car's speed. For instance, a police radar operating at 24.15 GHz (K-band) detecting a vehicle traveling at 30 m/s (108 km/h) will measure a Doppler shift of approximately 4.83 kHz, a change easily detected by modern digital signal processing. Moreover, the proximity fuze, developed during World War II, relies upon Doppler radar to detonate explosives at the correct time, height, distance, etc.

Bats use echolocation in a similar way to locate moths. The Doppler shift affects the frequency of the wave incident upon the target (moth). When the wave is reflected back from the moth to the bat, the moth acts as the wave emitter and the bat as the wave receiver. The frequency of the reflected wave is again Doppler-shifted. A bat, emitting a wave at the frequency $f$ and flying at $v_\textrm{b}$ towards a moth flying at $v_\textrm{t}$ will detect a final reflected wave with a frequency:
$$f_{\mathrm{bd}} = f \left(\frac{v_\textrm{m} - v_\textrm{t}}{v_\textrm{m} - v_\textrm{b}}\right)\left(\frac{v_\textrm{m} + v_\textrm{b}}{v_\textrm{m} + v_\textrm{t}}\right)$$

=== Medical ===
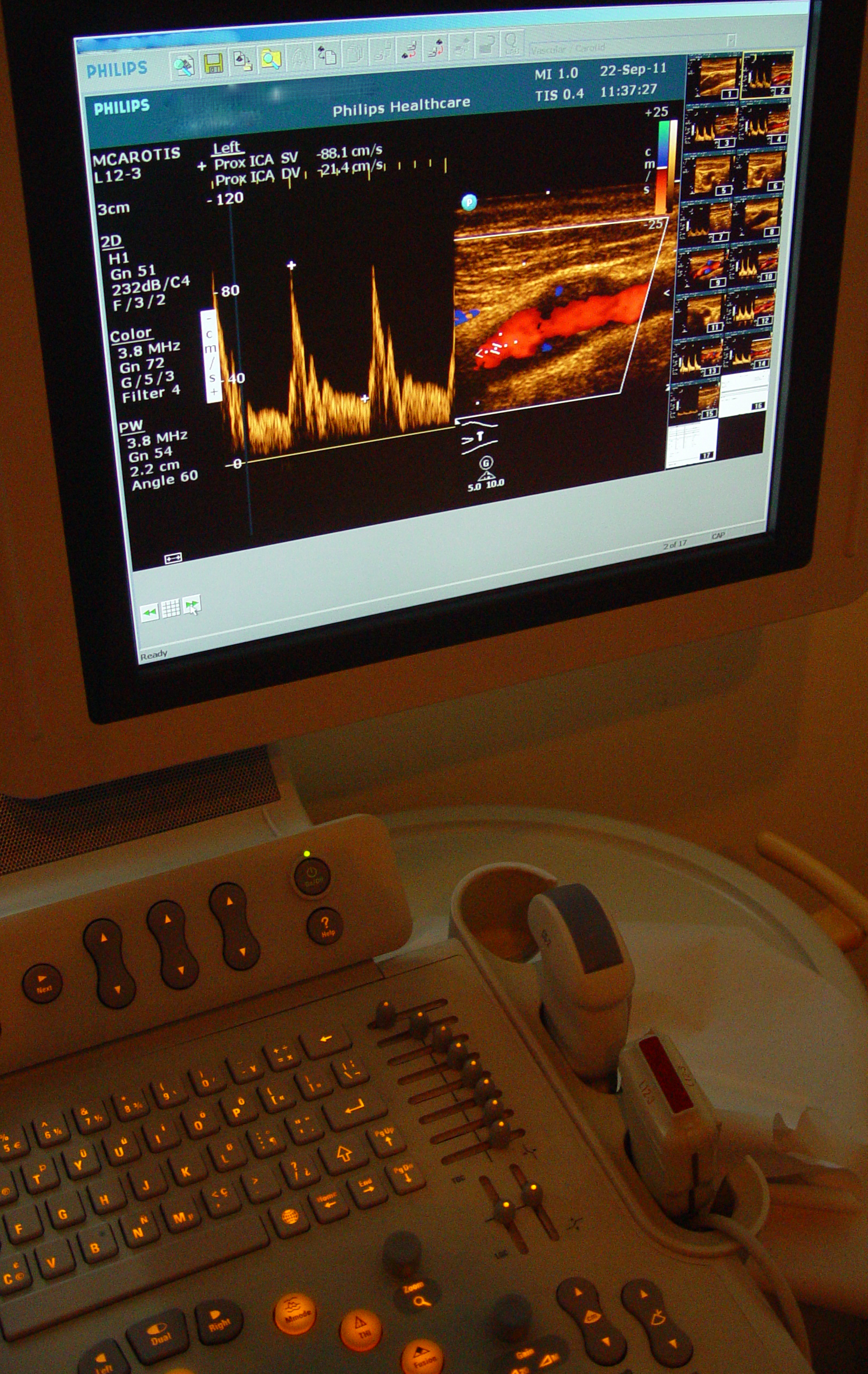
Colour flow ultrasonography (Doppler) of a carotid artery – scanner and screen

An echocardiogram can, within certain limits, produce an accurate assessment of the direction of blood flow and the velocity of blood and cardiac tissue at any arbitrary point using the Doppler effect. One of the limitations is that the ultrasound beam should be as parallel to the blood flow as possible. Velocity measurements allow assessment of cardiac valve areas and function, abnormal communications between the left and right side of the heart, leaking of blood through the valves (valvular regurgitation), and calculation of the cardiac output. Contrast-enhanced ultrasound using gas-filled microbubble contrast media can be used to improve velocity or other flow-related medical measurements.

Although "Doppler" has become synonymous with "velocity measurement" in medical imaging, in many cases it is not the frequency shift (Doppler shift) of the received signal that is measured, but the phase shift (when the received signal arrives).

Velocity measurements of blood flow are also used in other fields of medical ultrasonography, such as obstetric ultrasonography and neurology. Velocity measurement of blood flow in arteries and veins based on Doppler effect is an effective tool for diagnosis of vascular problems like stenosis.

=== Flow measurement ===
Instruments such as the laser Doppler velocimeter (LDV), Acoustic Doppler current profiler (ADCP), and acoustic Doppler velocimeter (ADV) have been developed to measure velocities in a fluid flow. The LDV emits a light beam, and the ADCP and ADV emits an ultrasonic acoustic burst, and measure the Doppler shift in wavelengths of reflections from particles moving with the flow. The actual flow is computed as a function of the water velocity and phase. This technique allows non-intrusive flow measurements, at high precision and high frequency.

=== Velocity profile measurement ===
Developed originally for velocity measurements in medical applications (blood flow), Ultrasonic Doppler Velocimetry (UDV) can measure in real time complete velocity profile in almost any liquids containing particles in suspension such as dust, gas bubbles, emulsions. Flows can be pulsating, oscillating, laminar or turbulent, stationary or transient. This technique is fully non-invasive.

=== Satellites ===
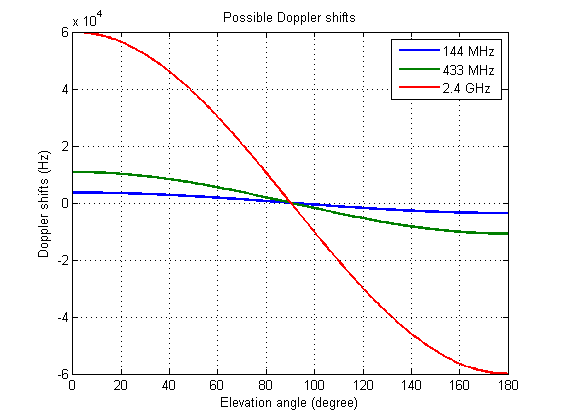
Possible Doppler shifts in dependence of the elevation angle (LEO: orbit altitude $h$ = 750 km). Fixed ground station.

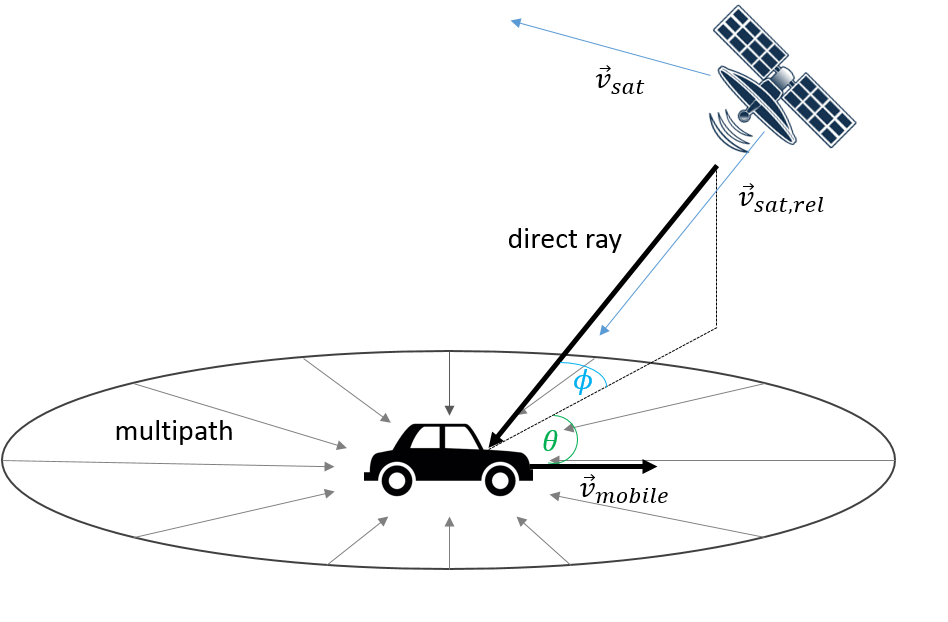
Geometry for Doppler effects. Variables: $\vec{v}_\text{mob}$ is the velocity of the mobile station, $\vec{v}_\text{Sat}$ is the velocity of the satellite, $\vec{v}_\text{rel,sat}$ is the relative velocity of the satellite, $\phi$ is the elevation angle of the satellite and $\theta$ is the driving direction with respect to the satellite.

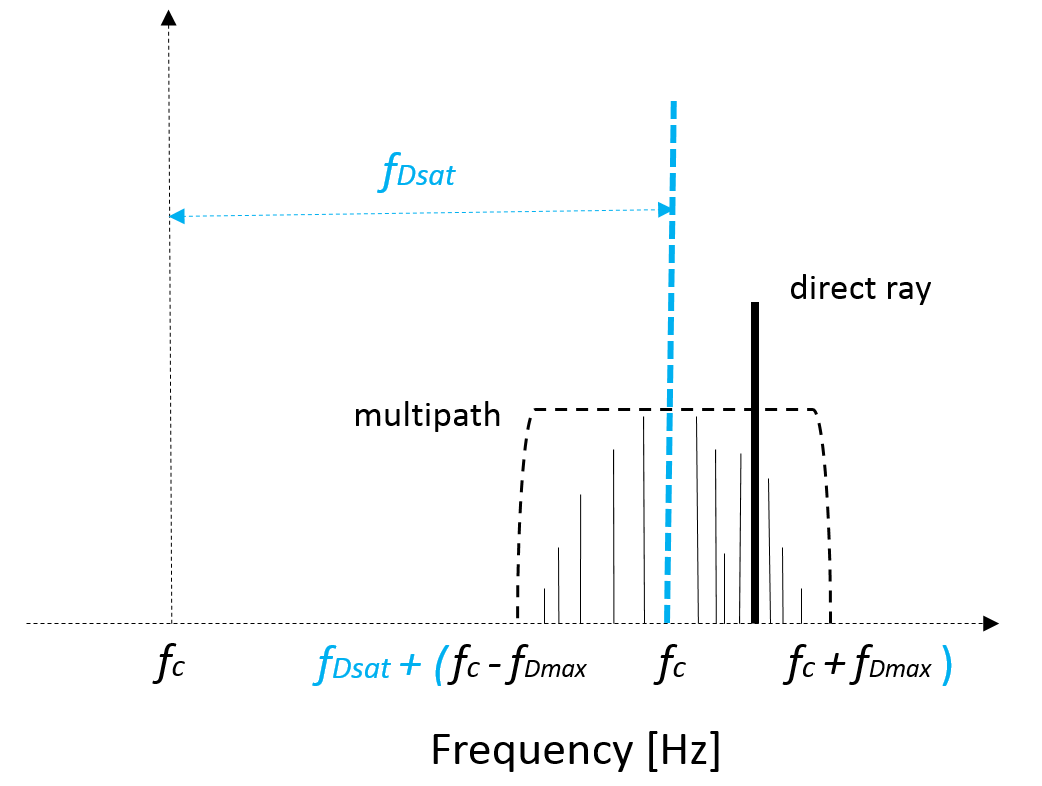
Doppler effect on the mobile channel. Variables: $f_c = \frac{c}{\lambda_{\rm c}}$ is the carrier frequency, $f_{\rm D,max}=\frac{v_{\rm mob}}{\lambda_{\rm c}}$ is the maximum Doppler shift due to the mobile station moving (see Doppler Spread) and $f_{\rm D,Sat}$ is the additional Doppler shift due to the satellite moving.

==== Satellite navigation ====
The Doppler shift can be exploited for satellite navigation such as in Transit and DORIS.

==== Satellite communication ====
Doppler also needs to be compensated in satellite communication. Fast moving satellites can have a Doppler shift of dozens of kilohertz relative to a ground station. The speed, thus magnitude of Doppler effect, changes due to earth curvature. Dynamic Doppler compensation, where the frequency of a signal is changed progressively during transmission, is used so the satellite receives a constant frequency signal. After realizing that the Doppler shift had not been considered before launch of the Huygens probe of the 2005 Cassini–Huygens mission, the probe trajectory was altered to approach Titan in such a way that its transmissions traveled perpendicular to its direction of motion relative to Cassini, greatly reducing the Doppler shift.

Doppler shift of the direct path can be estimated by the following formula:
$$f_{\rm D, dir} = \frac{v_{\rm mob}}{\lambda_{\rm c}}\cos\phi \cos\theta$$
where $v_\text{mob}$ is the speed of the mobile station, $\lambda_{\rm c}$ is the wavelength of the carrier, $\phi$ is the elevation angle of the satellite and $\theta$ is the driving direction with respect to the satellite.

The additional Doppler shift due to the satellite moving can be described as:
$$f_{\rm D,sat} = \frac{v_{\rm rel,sat}}{\lambda_{\rm c}}$$
where $v_{\rm rel,sat}$ is the relative speed of the satellite.

=== Audio ===
The Leslie speaker, most commonly associated with and predominantly used with the famous Hammond organ, takes advantage of the Doppler effect by using an electric motor to rotate an acoustic horn around a loudspeaker, sending its sound in a circle. This results at the listener's ear in rapidly fluctuating frequencies of a keyboard note.

=== Vibration measurement ===
A laser Doppler vibrometer (LDV) is a non-contact instrument for measuring vibration. The laser beam from the LDV is directed at the surface of interest, and the vibration amplitude and frequency are extracted from the Doppler shift of the laser beam frequency due to the motion of the surface.

=== Robotics ===
Dynamic real-time path planning in robotics to aid the movement of robots in a sophisticated environment with moving obstacles often take help of Doppler effect. Such applications are specially used for competitive robotics where the environment is constantly changing, such as robosoccer.

== Inverse Doppler effect ==
Since 1968 scientists such as Victor Veselago have speculated about the possibility of an inverse Doppler effect. The size of the Doppler shift depends on the refractive index of the medium a wave is traveling through. Some materials are capable of negative refraction, which should lead to a Doppler shift that works in a direction opposite that of a conventional Doppler shift. The first experiment that detected this effect was conducted by Nigel Seddon and Trevor Bearpark in Bristol, United Kingdom in 2003. Later, the inverse Doppler effect was observed in some inhomogeneous materials, and predicted inside a Vavilov–Cherenkov cone.

== See also ==
- Bistatic Doppler shift
- Differential Doppler effect
- Doppler cooling – Laser cooling technique
- Dopplergraph
- Fading – Term in wireless communications
- Fizeau experiment – Experiment measuring the speed of light in moving water
- Laser Doppler imaging
- Photoacoustic Doppler effect
- Range rate
- Rayleigh fading – Radio signal statistical model
- Redshift – Change in wavelength of light
- Relativistic Doppler effect – Scientific phenomenon
