= Anode ray =

Beam of positively charged ions

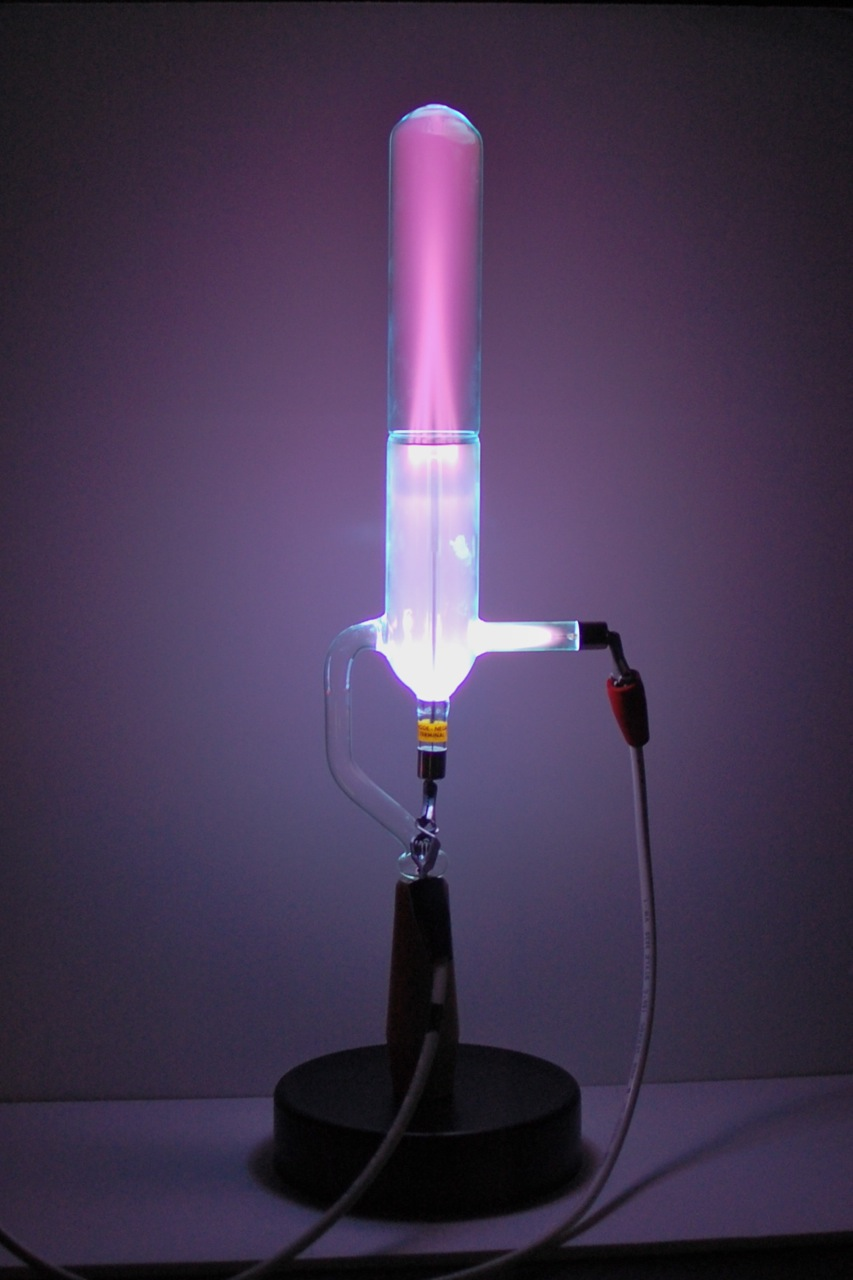
Anode ray tube showing the rays passing through the perforated cathode and causing the pink glow above it.

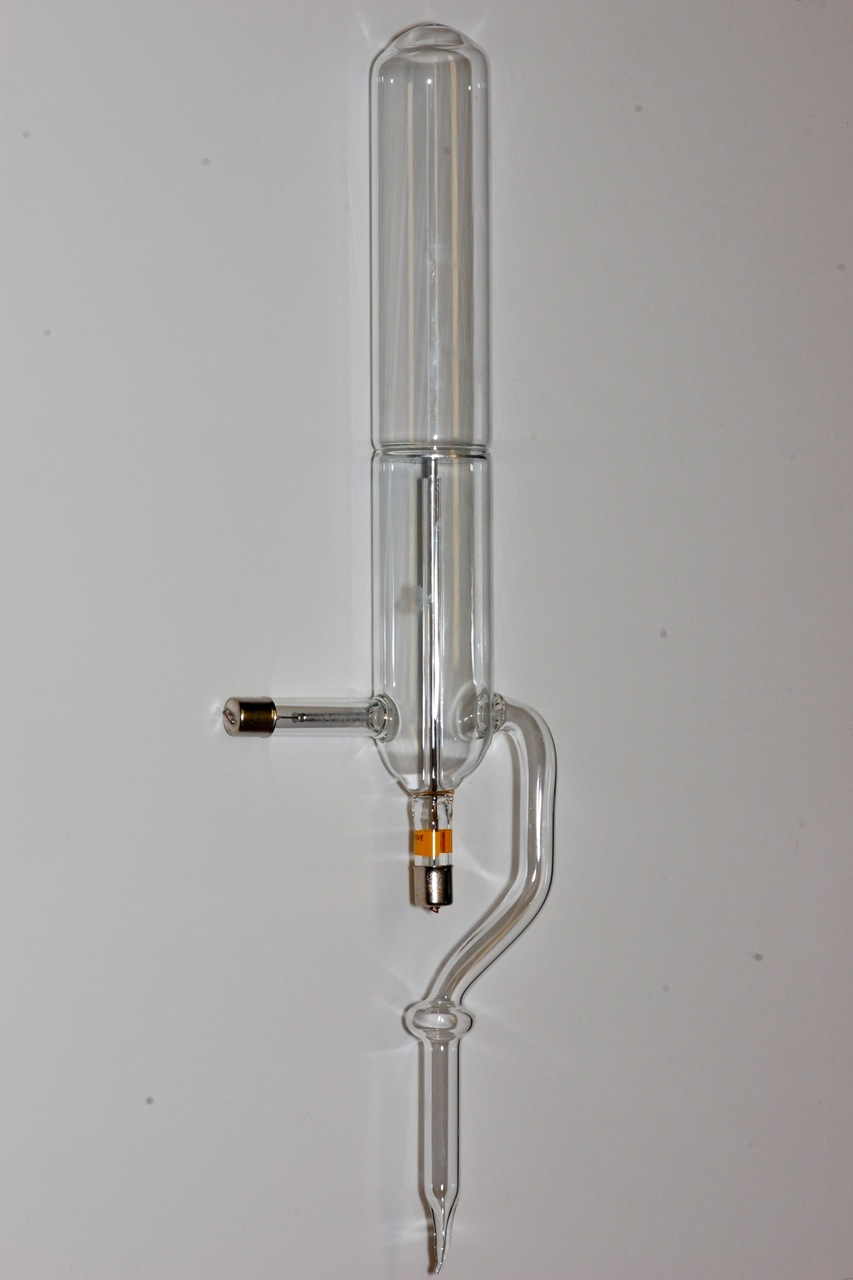
Anode ray tube, turned-off condition

An anode ray (also positive ray or canal ray) is a beam of positive ions that is created by certain types of gas-discharge tubes. They were first observed in Crookes tubes during experiments by the German scientist Eugen Goldstein, in 1886. Later work on anode rays by Wilhelm Wien and J. J. Thomson led to the development of mass spectrometry.

== Anode ray tube ==
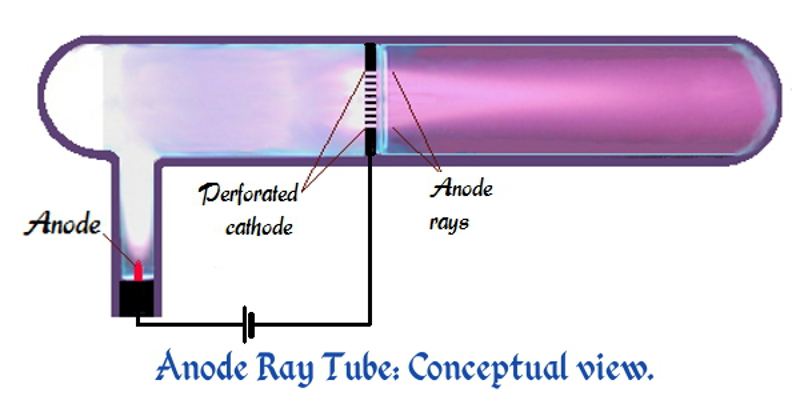
Simplified representation of an anode ray tube, showing the rays to the right of the perforated cathode

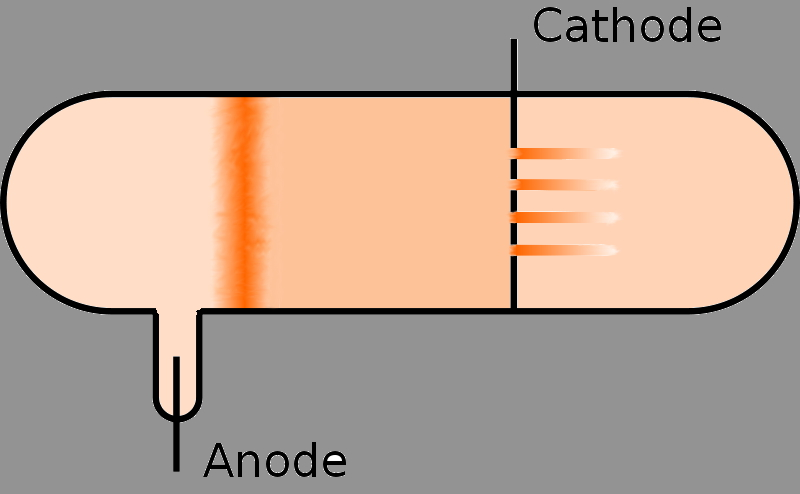
Anode ray tube schematics

Goldstein used a gas-discharge tube which had a perforated cathode. When an electrical potential of several thousand volts is applied between the cathode and anode, faint luminous "rays" are seen extending from the holes in the back of the cathode. These rays are beams of particles moving in a direction opposite to the "cathode rays", which are streams of electrons which move toward the anode. Goldstein called these positive rays Kanalstrahlen, "channel rays", or "canal rays", because these rays passed through the holes or channels in the cathode.

The process by which anode rays are formed in a gas-discharge anode ray tube is as follows. When the high voltage is applied to the tube, its electric field accelerates the small number of ions (electrically charged atoms) always present in the gas, created by natural processes such as radioactivity. These collide with atoms of the gas, knocking electrons off them and creating more positive ions. These ions and electrons in turn strike more atoms, creating more positive ions in a chain reaction. The positive ions are all attracted to the negative cathode, and some pass through the holes in the cathode. These are the anode rays.

By the time they reach the cathode, the ions have been accelerated to a sufficient speed such that when they collide with other atoms or molecules in the gas they excite the species to a higher energy level. In returning to their former energy levels these atoms or molecules release the energy that they had gained. That energy gets emitted as light. This light-producing process, called fluorescence, causes a glow in the region behind the cathode.

== Anode ray ion source ==
An anode ray ion source typically is an anode coated with the halide salt of an alkali or alkaline earth metal. Application of a sufficiently high electrical potential creates alkali or alkaline earth ions and their emission is most brightly visible at the anode.
