= Thermodynamic instruments =

Device for measuring thermodynamic properties

A thermodynamic instrument is any device for the measurement of thermodynamic systems. In order for a thermodynamic parameter or physical quantity to be truly defined, a technique for its measurement must be specified. For example, the ultimate definition of temperature is "what a thermometer reads". The question follows – what is a thermometer?

There are two types of thermodynamic instruments: the meter and the reservoir. A thermodynamic meter is any device which measures any parameter of a thermodynamic system. A thermodynamic reservoir is a system which is so large that it does not appreciably alter its state parameters when brought into contact with the test system.

== Overview ==
Two general complementary tools are the meter and the reservoir. It is important that these two types of instruments are distinct. A meter does not perform its task accurately if it behaves like a reservoir of the state variable it is trying to measure. If, for example, a thermometer, were to act as a temperature reservoir it would alter the temperature of the system being measured, and the reading would be incorrect. Ideal meters have no effect on the state variables of the system they are measuring.

== Thermodynamic meters ==
A meter is a thermodynamic system which displays some aspect of its thermodynamic state to the observer. The nature of its contact with the system it is measuring can be controlled, and it is sufficiently small that it does not appreciably affect the state of the system being measured. The theoretical thermometer described below is just such a meter.

In some cases, the thermodynamic parameter is actually defined in terms of an idealized measuring instrument. For example, the zeroth law of thermodynamics states that if two bodies are in thermal equilibrium with a third body, they are also in thermal equilibrium with each other. This principle, as noted by James Maxwell in 1872, asserts that it is possible to measure temperature. An idealized thermometer is a sample of an ideal gas at constant pressure.

From the ideal gas law, the volume of such a sample can be used as an indicator of temperature; in this manner it defines temperature. Although pressure is defined mechanically, a pressure-measuring device called a barometer may also be constructed from a sample of an ideal gas held at a constant temperature. A calorimeter is a device which is used to measure and define the internal energy of a system.

Some common thermodynamic meters are:

- Thermometer – a device which measures temperature as described above
- Barometer – a device which measures pressure, most notably atmospheric pressure. An ideal gas barometer may be constructed by mechanically connecting an ideal gas to the system being measured, while thermally insulating it. The volume will then measure pressure, by the ideal gas equation P = NkT/V.
- Calorimeter – a device which measures the heat energy added to a system. A simple calorimeter is simply a thermometer connected to a thermally isolated system.

== Thermodynamic reservoirs ==
A reservoir is a thermodynamic system which controls the state of a system, usually by "imposing" itself upon the system being controlled. This means that the nature of its contact with the system can be controlled. A reservoir is so large that its thermodynamic state is not appreciably affected by the state of the system being controlled. The term "atmospheric pressure" in the below description of a theoretical thermometer is essentially a "pressure reservoir" which imposes atmospheric pressure upon the thermometer.

Some common reservoirs are:

- Pressure reservoir – by far the most common pressure reservoir is the Earth's atmosphere.
- Temperature reservoir – A large quantity of water at its triple point forms an effective temperature reservoir.

== Theory ==
Let's assume that we understand mechanics well enough to understand and measure volume, area, mass, and force. These may be combined to understand the concept of pressure, which is force per unit area and density, which is mass per unit volume. It has been experimentally determined that, at low enough pressures and densities, all gases behave as ideal gases. The behavior of an ideal gas is given by the ideal gas law:

$$PV=NkT\,$$

where P is pressure, V is volume, N is the number of particles (total mass divided by mass per particle), k is the Boltzmann constant, and T is temperature. In fact, this equation is more than a phenomenological equation, it gives an operational, or experimental, definition of temperature. A thermometer is a tool that measures temperature - a primitive thermometer would simply be a small container of an ideal gas, that was allowed to expand against atmospheric pressure. If we bring it into thermal contact with the system whose temperature we wish to measure, wait until it equilibrates, and then measure the volume of the thermometer, we will be able to calculate the temperature of the system in question via T = PV/Nk. Hopefully, the thermometer will be small enough that it does not appreciably alter the temperature of the system it is measuring, and also that the atmospheric pressure is not affected by the expansion of the thermometer.

The ideal gas thermometer can be defined more precisely by saying it is a system containing an ideal gas, which is thermally connected to the system it is measuring, while being dynamically and materially insulated from it. It is simultaneously dynamically connected to an external pressure reservoir, from which it is materially and thermally insulated. Other thermometers (e.g. mercury thermometers, which display the volume of mercury to the observer), may now be constructed, and calibrated against the ideal gas thermometer.
