= Mechanically isolated system =

In thermodynamics, a mechanically isolated system is a system that is mechanically constrained to disallow deformations, so that it cannot perform any work on its environment. It may however, exchange heat across the system boundary.

For a simple system, mechanical isolation is equivalent to a state of constant volume and any process which occurs in such a simple system is said to be isochoric.

The opposite of a mechanically isolated system is a mechanically open system, which allows the transfer of mechanical energy. For a simple system, a mechanically open boundary is one that is allowed to move under pressure differences between the two sides of the boundary. At mechanical equilibrium, the pressures on both sides of a mechanically open boundary are equal, but only a mechanically isolating boundary can support pressure differences.

== See also ==
- Closed system
- Thermally isolated system
- Dynamical system
- Open system
- Thermodynamic system
- Isolated system
