= Three laws =

The Three Laws may refer to:

== Science ==
- Kepler's laws of planetary motion, three scientific laws describing the motion of planets around the Sun
- Newton's laws of motion, three physical laws that, together, laid the foundation for classical mechanics
- The laws of thermodynamics, originally three physical laws describing thermodynamic systems, though a fourth one was later formulated and is now counted as the zeroth law of thermodynamics

== Other ==
- Clarke's three laws, three adages from British science-fiction writer Arthur C. Clarke's extensive writings about the future
- Three Laws of Robotics, a set of rules devised by the science fiction author Isaac Asimov
