= Thermally isolated system =

In thermodynamics, a thermally isolated system can exchange no mass or heat energy with its environment. The internal energy of a thermally isolated system may therefore change due to the exchange of work energy. The entropy of a thermally isolated system will increase over time if it is not at equilibrium, but as long as it is at equilibrium, its entropy will be at a maximum and constant value and will not change, no matter how much work energy the system exchanges with its environment. To maintain this constant entropy, any exchange of work energy with the environment must therefore be quasi-static in nature in order to ensure that the system remains essentially at equilibrium during the process.

The opposite of a thermally isolated system is a thermally open system, which allows the transfer of heat energy and entropy. Thermally open systems may vary, however, in the rate at which they equilibrate, depending on the nature of the boundary of the open system. At equilibrium, the temperatures on both sides of a thermally open boundary are equal. At equilibrium, only a thermally isolating boundary can support a temperature difference.

== See also ==
- Closed system
- Dynamical system
- Mechanically isolated system
- Open system
- Thermodynamic system
- Isolated system
