= Diathermal =

Diathermal or diathermic may refer to:

- Related to diathermy, e.g., diathermic therapy
- Diathermal wall, in thermodynamics, allowing (only) heat transfer
- Diathermal oil, oil used for heat transfer
