= Sense and respond =

Lean methodology

Sense and respond has been used in control theory for several decades, primarily in closed systems such as refineries where comparisons are made between measurements and desired values, and system settings are adjusted to narrow the gap between the two. Since the early 1980s, sense and respond has also been used to describe the behavior of certain open systems.

Sense and respond is based on lean principles and follows URSLIMM:

- U - understand customer value
- R - remove waste
- S - standardize
- L - learn by doing
- I - involve everyone
- M - measure what matters
- M - manage performance visually

The term "sense and respond" as a business concept was used in a 1992 American Management Association Management Review article by Stephan H. Haeckel. It was developed by Haeckel at IBM’s Advanced Business Institute.

== Publications ==
- 2010 “The Post-Industrial Manager,” Marketing Management Magazine, Fall, 2010, pp 24–32.
- 2003 “Leading On Demand Businesses – Executives as Architects,” IBM Systems Journal, Vol 42, No 3, 2003, pp 405–413
- 2003 “Making Meaning Out of Apparent Noise,” in Long Range Planning, April, 2004, Special Issue of articles from May 4, 2003 Wharton Conference “Peripheral Vision: Sensing and Acting on Weak Signals,” Vol 37/2 pp 181–189
- 2000 “Managing Knowledge in Adaptive Enterprises,” Chapter in Knowledge Horizons: The Present and the Promise of Knowledge Management, edited by C. Despres and D. Chauvel, Butterworth-Heinemann
- 1999 Adaptive Enterprise: Creating and Leading Sense-and-Respond Organizations, Harvard Business School Press
- 1993 “Managing By Wire,” Harvard Business Review: Vol. 71, No. 5, September–October (with R.L. Nolan)
- 1992 “From ‘Make and Sell’ to ‘Sense and Respond,’” Management Review, American Management Association, October
