= Gas thermometer =

Thermometer that measures temperature by variation in volume or pressure of a gas

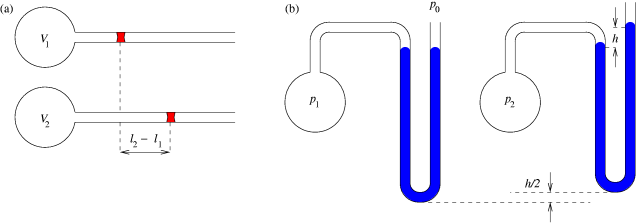
Two variants of a gas thermometer

A gas thermometer is a reference thermometer that measures temperature over a wide range, using the pressure or volume change of a confined gas as its operating mechanism.

== Constant-pressure thermometer ==
According to Charles's law, the volume of gas is directly proportional to the temperature of that gas, when its pressure and mass are kept constant; that is,

$$V \propto T\,$$

In other words,

$$\frac{V}{T}=k \Rightarrow\frac{V_1}{T_1}=\frac{V_2}{T_2} \Rightarrow\frac{\Delta V}{V_1}=\frac{\Delta T}{T_1}$$

where $V$ is the volume, $T$ is the thermodynamic temperature and $k$ is the constant for the system. The constant $k$ is not a fixed constant across all systems and therefore needs to be found experimentally for a given system through testing with known temperature values.

This works on the same principle as mercury thermometers. If a change in volume can be measured with one standard known temperature (such as the melting point of water), the second unknown temperature can be determined.

== Constant-volume thermometer and absolute zero ==
The constant-volume gas thermometer works on the basis of the pressure-temperature law: when the volume of a gas is kept constant, its pressure is directly proportional its temperature.

$$P\propto T$$

That is,

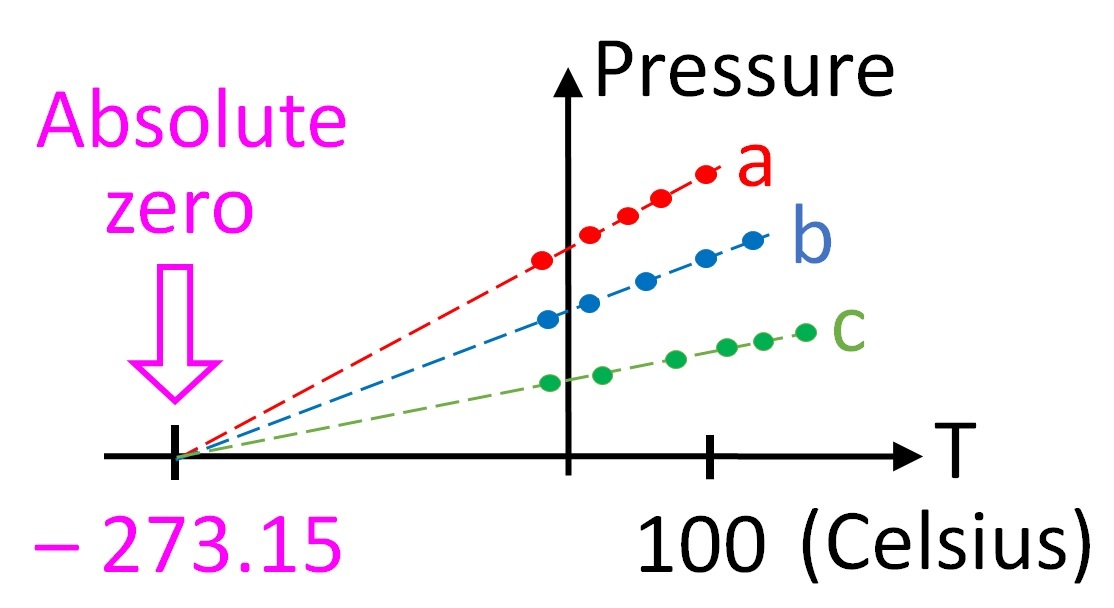
Plots of pressure vs temperature for three different gas samples extrapolate to absolute zero.

$$\frac{P_1}{T_1}=\frac{P_2}{T_2}$$

The constant volume gas thermometer plays a crucial role in understanding how absolute zero could be discovered long before the advent of cryogenics.

Consider a graph of pressure versus temperature made around standard conditions (well above absolute zero) for three different samples of any ideal gas (a, b, c). To the extent that the gas is ideal, the pressure depends linearly on temperature, and the extrapolation to zero pressure occurs at absolute zero. Note that data could have been collected with three different amounts of the same gas, which would have rendered this experiment easy to do in the eighteenth century.

== See also ==
- Thermodynamic instruments
- Boyle's law
- Combined gas law
- Gay-Lussac's law
- Avogadro's law
- Ideal gas law
