= Thermodynamics =

Physics of heat, work, and temperature

Thermodynamics is a branch of physics that deals with heat, work, and temperature, and their relation to energy, entropy, and the physical properties of matter and radiation. The behavior of these quantities is governed by the four laws of thermodynamics, which convey a quantitative description using measurable macroscopic physical quantities but may be explained in terms of microscopic constituents by statistical mechanics. Thermodynamics applies to various topics in science and engineering, especially physical chemistry, biochemistry, chemical engineering, and mechanical engineering, as well as other complex fields such as meteorology.

Historically, thermodynamics developed out of a desire to increase the efficiency of early steam engines, particularly through the work of French physicist Sadi Carnot (1824). Scots-Irish physicist Lord Kelvin is the first to have formulated a concise definition of thermodynamics in 1854 which states, "Thermo-dynamics is the subject of the relation of heat to forces acting between contiguous parts of bodies, and the relation of heat to electrical agency." German physicist and mathematician Rudolf Clausius restated Carnot's principle known as the Carnot cycle and gave the theory of heat a more accurate and sounder basis. His most important paper, "On the Moving Force of Heat", published in 1850, first stated the second law of thermodynamics. In 1865 he named the concept of entropy. In 1870 he introduced the virial theorem, which applied to heat.

The initial application of thermodynamics to mechanical heat engines was quickly extended to the study of chemical compounds and chemical reactions. Chemical thermodynamics studies the nature of the role of entropy in the process of chemical reactions and has provided the bulk of expansion and knowledge of the field. Other formulations of thermodynamics emerged. Statistical thermodynamics, or statistical mechanics, concerns itself with statistical predictions of the collective motion of particles from their microscopic behavior. In 1909, Constantin Carathéodory presented a purely mathematical approach in an axiomatic formulation, a description often referred to as geometrical thermodynamics.

== Introduction ==
A description of any thermodynamic system employs the four laws of thermodynamics that form an axiomatic basis. The first law specifies that energy can be transferred between physical systems as heat, as work, and with the transfer of matter. The second law defines the existence of a quantity called entropy, which describes the direction, thermodynamically, that a system can evolve and quantifies the state of order of a system and which can be used to quantify the useful work that can be extracted from the system.

In thermodynamics, interactions between large ensembles of objects are studied and categorized. Central to this are the concepts of the thermodynamic system and its surroundings. A system is composed of particles, whose average motions define its properties, and those properties are in turn related to one another through equations of state. Properties can be combined to express internal energy and thermodynamic potentials, which are useful for determining conditions for equilibrium and spontaneous processes.

With these tools, thermodynamics can be used to describe how systems respond to changes in their environment. This can be applied to a wide variety of topics in science and engineering, such as engines, phase transitions, chemical reactions, transport phenomena, and even black holes. The results of thermodynamics are essential for other fields of physics and for chemistry, chemical engineering, corrosion engineering, aerospace engineering, mechanical engineering, cell biology, biomedical engineering, materials science, and economics, to name a few.

This article is focused mainly on classical thermodynamics which primarily studies systems in thermodynamic equilibrium. Non-equilibrium thermodynamics is often treated as an extension of the classical treatment, but statistical mechanics has brought many advances to that field.

== History ==
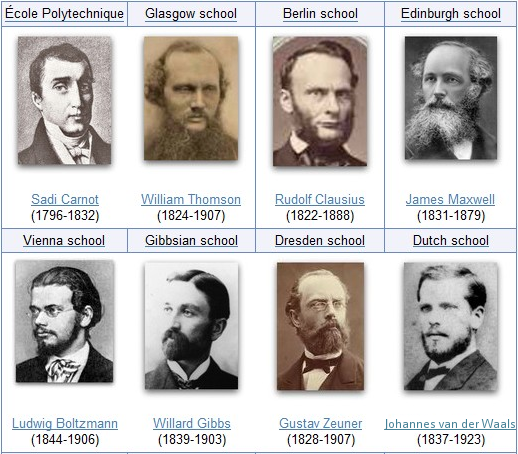
The thermodynamicists of the original eight founding schools of thermodynamics. The schools with the most-lasting influence on the modern versions of thermodynamics are the Berlin school, particularly Rudolf Clausius's 1865 textbook The Mechanical Theory of Heat, the Vienna school, with the statistical mechanics of Ludwig Boltzmann, and the Gibbsian school at Yale University of Willard Gibbs' 1876 and his book On the Equilibrium of Heterogeneous Substances which launched chemical thermodynamics.

The history of thermodynamics as a scientific discipline generally begins with Otto von Guericke who, in 1650, built and designed the world's first vacuum pump and demonstrated a vacuum using his Magdeburg hemispheres. Guericke was driven to make a vacuum in order to disprove Aristotle's long-held supposition that 'nature abhors a vacuum'. Shortly after Guericke, the Anglo-Irish physicist and chemist Robert Boyle had learned of Guericke's designs and, in 1656, in coordination with English scientist Robert Hooke, built an air pump. Using this pump, Boyle and Hooke noticed a correlation between pressure, temperature, and volume. In time, Boyle's Law was formulated, which states that pressure and volume are inversely proportional. Then, in 1679, based on these concepts, an associate of Boyle's named Denis Papin built a steam digester, which was a closed vessel with a tightly fitting lid that confined steam until a high pressure was generated.

Later designs implemented a steam release valve that kept the machine from exploding. By watching the valve rhythmically move up and down, Papin conceived of the idea of a piston and a cylinder engine. He did not, however, follow through with his design. Nevertheless, in 1697, based on Papin's designs, engineer Thomas Savery built the first engine, followed by Thomas Newcomen in 1712. Although these early engines were crude and inefficient, they attracted the attention of the leading scientists of the time.

The fundamental concepts of heat capacity and latent heat, which were necessary for the development of thermodynamics, were developed by Professor Joseph Black at the University of Glasgow, where James Watt was employed as an instrument maker. Black and Watt performed experiments together, but it was Watt who conceived the idea of the external condenser which resulted in a large increase in steam engine efficiency. Drawing on all the previous work led Sadi Carnot, the "father of thermodynamics", to publish Reflections on the Motive Power of Fire (1824), a discourse on heat, power, energy and engine efficiency. The book outlined the basic energetic relations between the Carnot engine, the Carnot cycle, and motive power. It marked the start of thermodynamics as a modern science.

The first thermodynamic textbook was written in 1859 by William Rankine, originally trained as a physicist and a civil and mechanical engineering professor at the University of Glasgow. The first and second laws of thermodynamics emerged simultaneously in the 1850s, primarily out of the works of William Rankine, Rudolf Clausius, and William Thomson (Lord Kelvin). The foundations of statistical thermodynamics were set out by physicists such as James Clerk Maxwell, Ludwig Boltzmann, Max Planck, Rudolf Clausius and J. Willard Gibbs.

Clausius, who first stated the basic ideas of the second law in his paper "On the Moving Force of Heat", published in 1850, and is called "one of the founding fathers of thermodynamics", introduced the concept of entropy in 1865.

During the years 1873–76 the American mathematical physicist Josiah Willard Gibbs published a series of three papers, the most famous being On the Equilibrium of Heterogeneous Substances, in which he showed how thermodynamic processes, including chemical reactions, could be graphically analyzed, by studying the energy, entropy, volume, temperature and pressure of the thermodynamic system in such a manner, one can determine if a process would occur spontaneously. Also Pierre Duhem in the 19th century wrote about chemical thermodynamics. During the early 20th century, chemists such as Gilbert N. Lewis, Merle Randall, and E. A. Guggenheim applied the mathematical methods of Gibbs to the analysis of chemical processes.

== Etymology ==
Thermodynamics has an intricate etymology.

By a surface-level analysis, the word consists of two parts that can be traced back to Ancient Greek. Firstly, thermo- ("of heat"; used in words such as thermometer) can be traced back to the root θέρμη therme, meaning "heat". Secondly, the word dynamics ("science of force [or power]") can be traced back to the root δύναμις dynamis, meaning "power".

In 1849, the adjective thermo-dynamic is used by William Thomson.

In 1854, the noun thermo-dynamics is used by Thomson and William Rankine to represent the science of generalized heat engines.

Pierre Perrot claims that the term thermodynamics was coined by James Joule in 1858 to designate the science of relations between heat and power, however, Joule never used that term, but used instead the term perfect thermo-dynamic engine in reference to Thomson's 1849 phraseology.

== Branches of thermodynamics ==
The study of thermodynamic systems has developed into several related branches, each using a different fundamental model as a theoretical or experimental basis, or applying the principles to varying types of systems.

=== Classical thermodynamics ===
Classical thermodynamics is the description of the states of thermodynamic systems at near-equilibrium, that uses macroscopic, measurable properties. It is used to model exchanges of energy, work and heat based on the laws of thermodynamics. The qualifier classical reflects the fact that it represents the first level of understanding of the subject as it developed in the 19th century and describes the changes of a system in terms of macroscopic empirical (large scale, and measurable) parameters. A microscopic interpretation of these concepts was later provided by the development of statistical mechanics.

=== Statistical mechanics ===
Statistical mechanics, also known as statistical thermodynamics, emerged with the development of atomic and molecular theories in the late 19th century and early 20th century, and supplemented classical thermodynamics with an interpretation of the microscopic interactions between individual particles or quantum-mechanical states. This field relates the microscopic properties of individual atoms and molecules to the macroscopic, bulk properties of materials that can be observed on the human scale, thereby explaining classical thermodynamics as a natural result of statistics, classical mechanics, and quantum theory at the microscopic level.

=== Chemical thermodynamics ===
Chemical thermodynamics is the study of the interrelation of energy with chemical reactions or with a physical change of state within the confines of the laws of thermodynamics. The primary objective of chemical thermodynamics is to determine the spontaneity of a given transformation.

=== Equilibrium thermodynamics ===
Equilibrium thermodynamics is the study of transfers of matter and energy in systems or bodies that, by agencies in their surroundings, can be driven from one state of thermodynamic equilibrium to another. The term 'thermodynamic equilibrium' indicates a state of balance, in which all macroscopic flows are zero; in the case of the simplest systems or bodies, their intensive properties are homogeneous, and their pressures are perpendicular to their boundaries. In an equilibrium state there are no unbalanced potentials, or driving forces, between macroscopically distinct parts of the system. A central aim in equilibrium thermodynamics is: given a system in a well-defined initial equilibrium state, and given its surroundings, and given its constitutive walls, to calculate what will be the final equilibrium state of the system after a specified thermodynamic operation has changed its walls or surroundings.

=== Non-equilibrium thermodynamics ===
Non-equilibrium thermodynamics is a branch of thermodynamics that deals with systems that are not in thermodynamic equilibrium. Most systems found in nature are not in thermodynamic equilibrium because they are not in stationary states, and are continuously and discontinuously subject to flux of matter and energy to and from other systems. The thermodynamic study of non-equilibrium systems requires more general concepts than are dealt with by equilibrium thermodynamics. Many natural systems still today remain beyond the scope of currently known macroscopic thermodynamic methods.

== Laws of thermodynamics ==
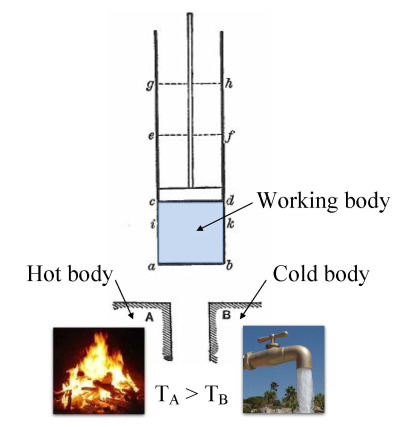
Annotated color version of the original 1824 Carnot heat engine showing the hot body (boiler), working body (system, steam), and cold body (water), the letters labeled according to the stopping points in Carnot cycle

Thermodynamics is principally based on a set of four laws which are universally valid when applied to systems that fall within the constraints implied by each. In the various theoretical descriptions of thermodynamics these laws may be expressed in seemingly differing forms, but the most prominent formulations are the following.

=== Zeroth law ===
The zeroth law of thermodynamics states: If two systems are each in thermal equilibrium with a third, they are also in thermal equilibrium with each other.

This statement implies that thermal equilibrium is an equivalence relation on the set of thermodynamic systems under consideration. Systems are said to be in equilibrium if the small, random exchanges between them (e.g. Brownian motion) do not lead to a net change in energy. This law is tacitly assumed in every measurement of temperature. Thus, if one seeks to decide whether two bodies are at the same temperature, it is not necessary to bring them into contact and measure any changes of their observable properties in time. The law provides an empirical definition of temperature, and justification for the construction of practical thermometers.

The zeroth law was not initially recognized as a separate law of thermodynamics, as its basis in thermodynamical equilibrium was implied in the other laws. The first, second, and third laws had been explicitly stated already, and found common acceptance in the physics community before the importance of the zeroth law for the definition of temperature was realized. As it was impractical to renumber the other laws, it was named the zeroth law.

=== First law ===
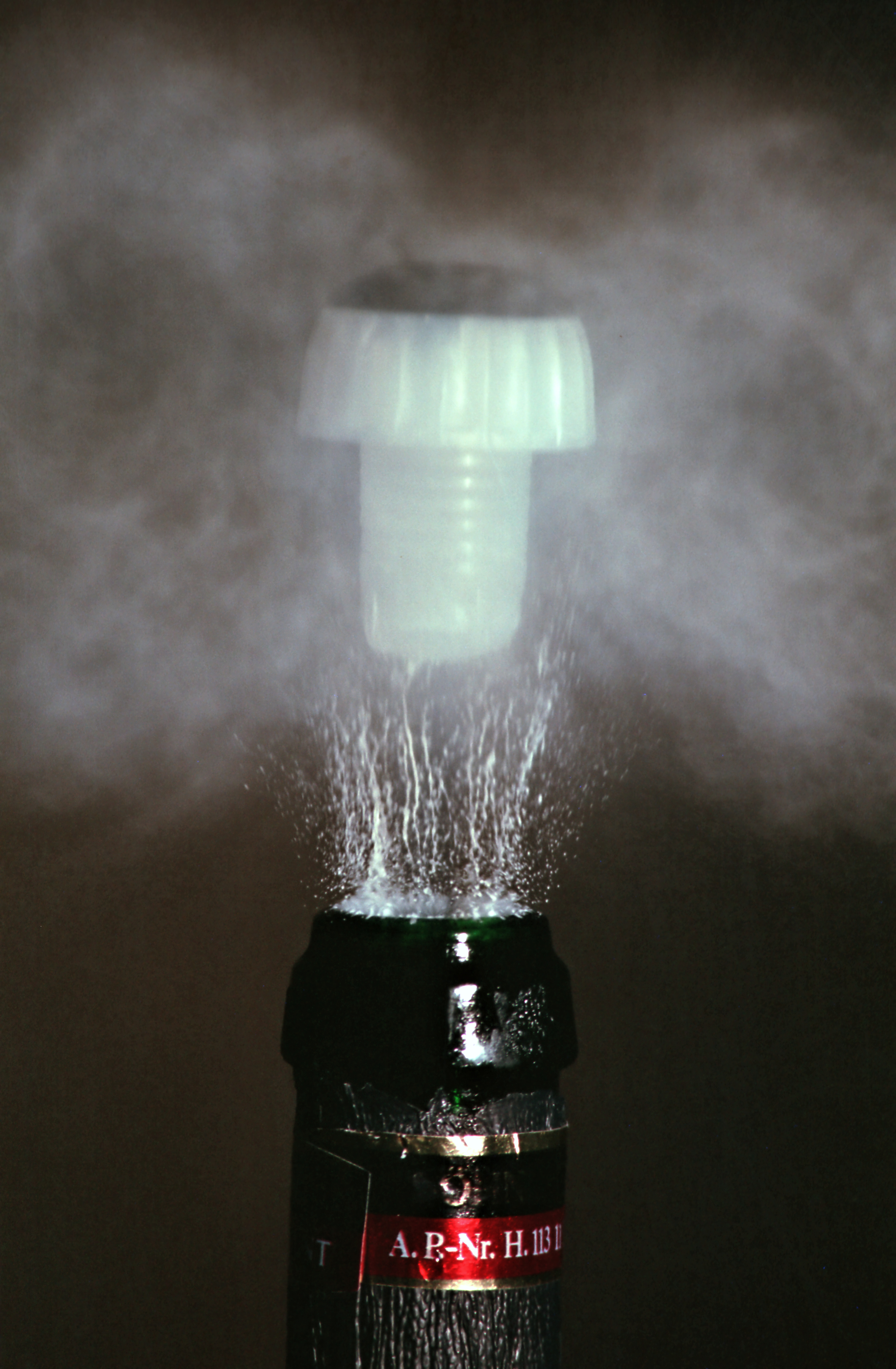
Opening a bottle of sparkling wine (high-speed photography). The sudden drop of pressure causes a huge drop of temperature. The moisture in the air freezes, creating a smoke of tiny ice crystals.

The first law of thermodynamics (a statement of the law of conservation of energy) states: In a process without transfer of matter, the change in internal energy, $\Delta U$, of a thermodynamic system is equal to the energy gained as heat, $Q$, less the thermodynamic work, $W$, done by the system on its surroundings. (Note: The sign convention (Q is heat supplied to the system as, W is work done by the system) is that of Rudolf Clausius. The opposite sign convention is customary in chemical thermodynamics.)

$$\Delta U = Q - W$$.

where $\Delta U$ denotes the change in the internal energy of a closed system (for which heat or work through the system boundary are possible, but matter transfer is not possible), $Q$ denotes the quantity of energy supplied to the system as heat, and $W$ denotes the amount of thermodynamic work done by the system on its surroundings. An equivalent statement is that perpetual motion machines of the first kind are impossible; work $W$ done by a system on its surrounding requires that the system's internal energy $U$ decrease or be consumed, so that the amount of internal energy lost by that work must be resupplied as heat $Q$ by an external energy source or as work by an external machine acting on the system (so that $U$ is recovered) to make the system work continuously.

For processes that include transfer of matter, a further statement is needed: With due account of the respective fiducial reference states of the systems, when two systems, which may be of different chemical compositions, initially separated only by an impermeable wall, and otherwise isolated, are combined into a new system by the thermodynamic operation of removal of the wall, then

$$U_0 = U_1 + U_2$$,

where U_{0} denotes the internal energy of the combined system, and U_{1} and U_{2} denote the internal energies of the respective separated systems.

Adapted for thermodynamics, this law is an expression of the principle of conservation of energy, which states that energy can be transformed (changed from one form to another), but cannot be created or destroyed.

Internal energy is a principal property of the thermodynamic state, while heat and work are modes of energy transfer by which a process may change this state. A change of internal energy of a system may be achieved by any combination of heat added or removed and work performed on or by the system. As a function of state, the internal energy does not depend on the manner, or on the path through intermediate steps, by which the system arrived at its state.

=== Second law ===
A traditional version of the second law of thermodynamics states: Heat does not spontaneously flow from a colder body to a hotter body.

The second law refers to a system of matter and radiation, initially with inhomogeneities in temperature, pressure, chemical potential, and other intensive properties, that are due to internal 'constraints', or impermeable rigid walls, within it, or to externally imposed forces. The law observes that, when the system is isolated from the outside world and from those forces, there is a definite thermodynamic quantity, its entropy, that increases as the constraints are removed, eventually reaching a maximum value at thermodynamic equilibrium, when the inhomogeneities practically vanish. For systems that are initially far from thermodynamic equilibrium, though several have been proposed, there is known no general physical principle that determines the rates of approach to thermodynamic equilibrium, and thermodynamics does not deal with such rates. The many versions of the second law all express the general irreversibility of the transitions involved in systems approaching thermodynamic equilibrium.

In macroscopic thermodynamics, the second law is a basic observation applicable to any actual thermodynamic process; in statistical thermodynamics, the second law is postulated to be a consequence of molecular chaos.

=== Third law ===
The third law of thermodynamics states: As the temperature of a system approaches absolute zero, all processes cease and the entropy of the system approaches a minimum value.

This law of thermodynamics is a statistical law of nature regarding entropy and the impossibility of reaching absolute zero of temperature. This law provides an absolute reference point for the determination of entropy. The entropy determined relative to this point is the absolute entropy. Alternative definitions include "the entropy of all systems and of all states of a system is smallest at absolute zero," or equivalently "it is impossible to reach the absolute zero of temperature by any finite number of processes".

Absolute zero, at which all activity would stop if it were possible to achieve, is −273.15 °C (degrees Celsius), or −459.67 °F (degrees Fahrenheit), or 0 K (kelvin), or 0° R (degrees Rankine).

== System models ==
A diagram of a generic thermodynamic system

An important concept in thermodynamics is the thermodynamic system, which is a precisely defined region of the universe under study. Everything in the universe except the system is called the surroundings. A system is separated from the remainder of the universe by a boundary which may be a physical or notional, but serve to confine the system to a finite volume. Segments of the boundary are often described as walls; they have respective defined 'permeabilities'. Transfers of energy as work, or as heat, or of matter, between the system and the surroundings, take place through the walls, according to their respective permeabilities.

Matter or energy that pass across the boundary so as to effect a change in the internal energy of the system need to be accounted for in the energy balance equation. The volume contained by the walls can be the region surrounding a single atom resonating energy, such as Max Planck defined in 1900; it can be a body of steam or air in a steam engine, such as Sadi Carnot defined in 1824. The system could also be just one nuclide (i.e. a system of quarks) as hypothesized in quantum thermodynamics. When a looser viewpoint is adopted, and the requirement of thermodynamic equilibrium is dropped, the system can be the body of a tropical cyclone, such as Kerry Emanuel theorized in 1986 in the field of atmospheric thermodynamics, or the event horizon of a black hole.

Boundaries are of four types: fixed, movable, real, and imaginary. For example, in an engine, a fixed boundary means the piston is locked at its position, within which a constant volume process might occur. If the piston is allowed to move that boundary is movable while the cylinder and cylinder head boundaries are fixed. For closed systems, boundaries are real while for open systems boundaries are often imaginary. In the case of a jet engine, a fixed imaginary boundary might be assumed at the intake of the engine, fixed boundaries along the surface of the case and a second fixed imaginary boundary across the exhaust nozzle.

Generally, thermodynamics distinguishes five classes of systems, defined in terms of what is allowed to cross their boundaries:

Interactions of thermodynamic systems
Type of system	Mass flow	Work	Heat
Open	✓	✓	✓
Closed	✗	✓	✓
Thermally isolated	✗	✓	✗
Mechanically isolated	✗	✗	✓
Isolated	✗	✗	✗

As time passes in an isolated system, internal differences of pressures, densities, and temperatures tend to even out. A system in which all equalizing processes have gone to completion is said to be in a state of thermodynamic equilibrium.

Once in thermodynamic equilibrium, a system's properties are, by definition, unchanging in time. Systems in equilibrium are much simpler and easier to understand than are systems which are not in equilibrium. Often, when analysing a dynamic thermodynamic process, the simplifying assumption is made that each intermediate state in the process is at equilibrium, producing thermodynamic processes which develop so slowly as to allow each intermediate step to be an equilibrium state and are said to be reversible processes.

== States and processes ==
When a system is at equilibrium under a given set of conditions, it is said to be in a definite thermodynamic state. The state of the system can be described by a number of state quantities that do not depend on the process by which the system arrived at its state. They are called intensive variables or extensive variables according to how they change when the size of the system changes. The properties of the system can be described by an equation of state which specifies the relationship between these variables. State may be thought of as the instantaneous quantitative description of a system with a set number of variables held constant.

A thermodynamic process may be defined as the energetic evolution of a thermodynamic system proceeding from an initial state to a final state. It can be described by process quantities. Typically, each thermodynamic process is distinguished from other processes in energetic character according to what parameters, such as temperature, pressure, or volume, etc., are held fixed; Furthermore, it is useful to group these processes into pairs, in which each variable held constant is one member of a conjugate pair.

Several commonly studied thermodynamic processes are:

- Adiabatic process: occurs without loss or gain of energy by heat
- Isenthalpic process: occurs at a constant enthalpy
- Isentropic process: a reversible adiabatic process, occurs at a constant entropy
- Isobaric process: occurs at constant pressure
- Isochoric process: occurs at constant volume (also called isometric/isovolumetric)
- Isothermal process: occurs at a constant temperature
- Steady-state process: occurs without a change in the internal energy

== Instrumentation ==
There are two types of thermodynamic instruments, the meter and the reservoir. A thermodynamic meter is any device which measures any parameter of a thermodynamic system. In some cases, the thermodynamic parameter is actually defined in terms of an idealized measuring instrument. For example, the zeroth law states that if two bodies are in thermal equilibrium with a third body, they are also in thermal equilibrium with each other. This principle, as noted by James Maxwell in 1872, asserts that it is possible to measure temperature. An idealized thermometer is a sample of an ideal gas at constant pressure. From the ideal gas law pV=nRT, the volume of such a sample can be used as an indicator of temperature; in this manner it defines temperature. Although pressure is defined mechanically, a pressure-measuring device, called a barometer may also be constructed from a sample of an ideal gas held at a constant temperature. A calorimeter is a device which is used to measure and define the internal energy of a system.

A thermodynamic reservoir is a system which is so large that its state parameters are not appreciably altered when it is brought into contact with the system of interest. When the reservoir is brought into contact with the system, the system is brought into equilibrium with the reservoir. For example, a pressure reservoir is a system at a particular pressure, which imposes that pressure upon the system to which it is mechanically connected. The Earth's atmosphere is often used as a pressure reservoir. The ocean can act as temperature reservoir when used to cool power plants.

== Conjugate variables ==
The central concept of thermodynamics is that of energy, the ability to do work. By the First Law, the total energy of a system and its surroundings is conserved. Energy may be transferred into a system by heating, compression, or addition of matter, and extracted from a system by cooling, expansion, or extraction of matter. In mechanics, for example, energy transfer equals the product of the force applied to a body and the resulting displacement.

Conjugate variables are pairs of thermodynamic concepts, with the first being akin to a "force" applied to some thermodynamic system, the second being akin to the resulting "displacement", and the product of the two equaling the amount of energy transferred. The common conjugate variables are:

- Pressure–volume (the mechanical parameters);
- Temperature–entropy (thermal parameters);
- Chemical potential–particle number (material parameters).

== Potentials ==
Thermodynamic potentials are different quantitative measures of the stored energy in a system. Potentials are used to measure the energy changes in systems as they evolve from an initial state to a final state. The potential used depends on the constraints of the system, such as constant temperature or pressure. For example, the Helmholtz and Gibbs energies are the energies available in a system to do useful work when the temperature and volume or the pressure and temperature are fixed, respectively. Thermodynamic potentials cannot be measured in laboratories, but can be computed using molecular thermodynamics.

The five most well known potentials are:

Name	Symbol	Formula	Natural variables
Internal energy	$U$	$\int \left( T \, \mathrm{d}S - p \, \mathrm{d}V + \sum_i \mu_i \mathrm{d}N_i \right)$	$S, V, \{N_i\}$
Helmholtz free energy	$A$	$U - TS$	$T, V, \{N_i\}$
Enthalpy	$H$	$U + pV$	$S, p, \{N_i\}$
Gibbs free energy	$G$	$U + pV - TS$	$T, p, \{N_i\}$
Landau potential, or grand potential	$\Omega$, $\Phi_\text{G}$	$U - T S -$$\sum_i\,$$\mu_i N_i$	$T, V, \{\mu_i\}$

where $T$ is the temperature, $S$ the entropy, $p$ the pressure, $V$ the volume, $\mu$ the chemical potential, $N$ the number of particles in the system, and $i$ is the count of particles types in the system.

Thermodynamic potentials can be derived from the energy balance equation applied to a thermodynamic system. Other thermodynamic potentials can also be obtained through Legendre transformation.

== Axiomatic thermodynamics ==
Axiomatic thermodynamics is a mathematical discipline that aims to describe thermodynamics in terms of rigorous axioms, for example by finding a mathematically rigorous way to express the familiar laws of thermodynamics.

The first attempt at an axiomatic theory of thermodynamics was Constantin Carathéodory's 1909 work Investigations on the Foundations of Thermodynamics, which made use of Pfaffian systems and the concept of adiabatic accessibility, a notion that was introduced by Carathéodory himself. In this formulation, thermodynamic concepts such as heat, entropy, and temperature are derived from quantities that are more directly measurable. Theories that came after, differed in the sense that they made assumptions regarding thermodynamic processes with arbitrary initial and final states, as opposed to considering only neighboring states.

== Applied fields ==
- Atmospheric thermodynamics
- Biological thermodynamics
- Black hole thermodynamics
- Chemical thermodynamics
- Classical thermodynamics
- Equilibrium thermodynamics
- Industrial ecology (re: Exergy)
- Maximum entropy thermodynamics
- Non-equilibrium thermodynamics
- Philosophy of thermal and statistical physics
- Psychrometrics
- Quantum thermodynamics
- Statistical thermodynamics, i.e. Statistical mechanics
- Thermoeconomics
- Polymer chemistry

== See also ==
- Thermodynamic process path
- Carnot engine (intuitive explanation)

=== Lists and timelines ===
- List of important publications in thermodynamics
- List of textbooks on thermodynamics and statistical mechanics
- List of thermal conductivities
- List of thermodynamic properties
- Table of thermodynamic equations
- Timeline of thermodynamics
- Thermodynamic equations
