= Parallel force system =

Situation in mechanical engineering

Parallel vertical forces acting on an airplane in straight and level flight. Lift from the main wing (Pz) is balanced by the weight of the airplane (mg) and the down-force on the horizontal stabilizer (Pzh).

In engineering, a parallel force system is a type of force system where in all forces are oriented along one axis.

An example of this type of system is a see saw. In a see saw, the children apply the two forces at the ends, and the fulcrum in the middle gives the counter force to maintain the see saw in a neutral position.

Another example are the major vertical forces on an airplane in flight.
