= Diathermal wall =

Barrier permeable to heat but not matter

In thermodynamics, a diathermal wall between two thermodynamic systems allows heat transfer but does not allow transfer of matter across it.

The diathermal wall is important because, in thermodynamics, it is customary to assume a priori, for a closed system, the physical existence of transfer of energy across a wall that is impermeable to matter but is not adiabatic, transfer which is called transfer of energy as heat, though it is not customary to label this assumption separately as an axiom or numbered law.

== Definitions of transfer of heat ==
In theoretical thermodynamics, respected authors vary in their approaches to the definition of quantity of heat transferred. There are two main streams of thinking. One is from a primarily empirical viewpoint (which will here be referred to as the thermodynamic stream), to define heat transfer as occurring only by specified macroscopic mechanisms; loosely speaking, this approach is historically older. The other (which will here be referred to as the mechanical stream) is from a primarily theoretical viewpoint, to define it as a residual quantity calculated after transfers of energy as macroscopic work, between two bodies or closed systems, have been determined for a process, so as to conform with the principle of conservation of energy or the first law of thermodynamics for closed systems; this approach grew in the twentieth century, though was partly manifest in the nineteenth.

=== Thermodynamic stream of thinking ===
In the thermodynamic stream of thinking, the specified mechanisms of heat transfer are conduction and radiation. These mechanisms presuppose recognition of temperature; empirical temperature is enough for this purpose, though absolute temperature can also serve. In this stream of thinking, quantity of heat is defined primarily through calorimetry.

Though its definition of them differs from that of the mechanical stream of thinking, the empirical stream of thinking nevertheless presupposes the existence of adiabatic enclosures. It defines them through the concepts of heat and temperature. These two concepts are coordinately coherent in the sense that they arise jointly in the description of experiments of transfer of energy as heat.

=== Mechanical stream of thinking ===
In the mechanical stream of thinking about closed systems, heat transferred is defined as a calculated residual amount of energy transferred after the energy transferred as work has been determined, assuming for the calculation the law of conservation of energy, without reference to the concept of temperature. There are five main elements of the underlying theory.

- The existence of states of thermodynamic equilibrium, determinable by precisely one (called the non-deformation variable) more variable of state than the number of independent work (deformation) variables.
- That a state of internal thermodynamic equilibrium of a body have a well defined internal energy, that is postulated by the first law of thermodynamics.
- The universality of the law of conservation of energy.
- The recognition of work as a form of energy transfer.
- The universal irreversibility of natural processes.
- The existence of adiabatic enclosures.
- The existence of walls permeable only to heat.

Axiomatic presentations of this stream of thinking vary slightly, but they intend to avoid the notions of heat and of temperature in their axioms. It is essential to this stream of thinking that heat is not presupposed as being measurable by calorimetry. It is essential to this stream of thinking that, for the specification of the thermodynamic state of a body or closed system, in addition to the variables of state called deformation variables, there be precisely one extra real-number-valued variable of state, called the non-deformation variable, though it should not be axiomatically recognized as an empirical temperature, even though it satisfies the criteria for one.

== Accounts of the diathermal wall ==
As mentioned above, a diathermal wall may pass energy as heat by thermal conduction, but not the matter. A diathermal wall can move and thus be a part of a transfer of energy as work. Amongst walls that are impermeable to matter, diathermal and adiabatic walls are contraries.

For radiation, some further comments may be useful.

In classical thermodynamics, one-way radiation, from one system to another, is not considered. Two-way radiation between two systems is one of the two mechanisms of transfer of energy as heat. It may occur across a vacuum, with the two systems separated from the intervening vacuum by walls that are permeable only to radiation; such an arrangement fits the definition of a diathermal wall. The balance of radiative transfer is transfer of heat.

In thermodynamics, it is not necessary that the radiative transfer of heat be of pure black-body radiation, nor of incoherent radiation. Of course black-body radiation is incoherent. Thus laser radiation counts in thermodynamics as a one-way component of two-way radiation that is heat transfer. Also, by the [Helmholtz reciprocity] principle, the target system radiates into the laser source system, though of course relatively weakly compared with the laser light. According to Planck, an incoherent monochromatic beam of light transfers entropy and has a temperature. For a transfer to qualify as work, it must be reversible in the surroundings, for example in the concept of a reversible work reservoir. Laser light is not reversible in the surroundings and is therefore a component of transfer of energy as heat, not work.

In radiative transfer theory, one-way radiation is considered. For investigation of Kirchhoff's law of thermal radiation the notions of absorptivity and emissivity are necessary, and they rest on the idea of one-way radiation. These things are important for the study of the Einstein coefficients, which relies partly on the notion of thermodynamic equilibrium.

For the thermodynamic stream of thinking, the notion of empirical temperature is coordinately presupposed in the notion of heat transfer for the definition of an adiabatic wall.

For the mechanical stream of thinking, the exact way in which the walls are defined is important.

In the presentation of Carathéodory, it is essential that the definition of the adiabatic wall should in no way depend upon the notions of heat or temperature. This is achieved by careful wording and reference to transfer of energy only as work. Buchdahl is careful in the same way. Nevertheless, Carathéodory explicitly postulates the existence of walls that are permeable only to heat, that is to say impermeable to work and to matter, but still permeable to energy in some unspecified way; they are called diathermal walls. One might be forgiven for inferring from this that heat is energy in transfer across walls permeable only to heat, and that such are admitted to exist unlabeled as postulated primitives.

The mechanical stream of thinking thus regards the adiabatic enclosure's property of not allowing the transfer of heat across itself as a deduction from the Carathéodory axioms of thermodynamics, and regards transfer as heat as a residual rather than a primary concept.
