= GENERIC formalism =

General form of the GENERIC equation

In non-equilibrium thermodynamics, GENERIC is an acronym for General Equation for Non-Equilibrium Reversible-Irreversible Coupling. It is the general form of dynamic equation for a system with both reversible and irreversible dynamics (generated by energy and entropy, respectively). GENERIC formalism is the theory built around the GENERIC equation, which has been proposed in its final form in 1997 by Miroslav Grmela and Hans Christian Öttinger.

== GENERIC equation ==
The GENERIC equation is usually written as

$$\frac{dx}{dt}=L(x)\cdot\frac{\delta E}{\delta x}(x)+M(x)\cdot\frac{\delta S}{\delta x}(x).$$

Here:

- $x$ denotes a set of variables used to describe the state space. The vector $x$ can also contain variables depending on a continuous index like a temperature field. In general, $x$ is a function $S\rightarrow\mathbb R$, where the set $S$ can contain both discrete and continuous indexes. Example: $x=(U,V,T(\vec r))$ for a gas with nonuniform temperature, contained in a volume $\Sigma\subset\mathbb R^3$ ($S=\{1,2\}\cup\Sigma$)
- $E(x)$, $S(x)$ are the system's total energy and entropy. For purely discrete state variables, these are simply functions from $\mathbb R^n$ to $\mathbb R$, for continuously indexed $x$, they are functionals
- $\delta E/\delta x$, $\delta S/\delta x$ are the derivatives of $E$ and $S$. In the discrete case, it is simply the gradient, for continuous variables, it is the functional derivative (a function $S\rightarrow\mathbb R$)
- the Poisson matrix $L(x)$ is an antisymmetric matrix (possibly depending on the continuous indexes) describing the reversible dynamics of the system according to Hamiltonian mechanics. The related Poisson bracket fulfills the Jacobi identity.
- the friction matrix $M(x)$ is a positive semidefinite (and hence symmetric) matrix describing the system's irreversible behaviour.

In addition to the above equation and the properties of its constituents, systems that ought to be properly described by the GENERIC formalism are required to fulfill the degeneracy conditions

$$L(x)\cdot\frac{\delta S}{\delta x}(x)=0$$

$$M(x)\cdot\frac{\delta E}{\delta x}(x)=0$$

which express the conservation of entropy under reversible dynamics and of energy under irreversible dynamics, respectively. The conditions on $L$ (antisymmetry and some others) express that the energy is reversibly conserved, and the condition on $M$ (positive semidefiniteness) express that the entropy is irreversibly non-decreasing.

== Related applications and simulation methods ==
- Viscoelasticity, complex fluids, polymers, soft matter
- Smoothed-particle hydrodynamics
- Stokesian dynamics
- Stochastic Eulerian Lagrangian methods
