= Force =

Influence that can change motion of an object

- Forces can be described as a push or pull on an object. They can be due to phenomena such as gravity, magnetism, or anything that might cause a mass to accelerate.
- Common symbols: $\vec F$, F, F
- SI unit: newton (N)
- Other units: dyne, pound-force, poundal, kip, kilopond
- In SI base units: kg·m·s^{−2}
- Derivations from other quantities: F = ma
- Dimension: $\mathsf{M} \mathsf{L} \mathsf{T}^{-2}$

In physics, a force is an action that can cause an object to change its velocity or its shape, or to resist other forces, or to cause changes of pressure in a fluid. In mechanics, force makes ideas like pushing or pulling mathematically precise. Because the magnitude and direction of a force are both important, force is a vector quantity (force vector). The SI unit of force is the newton (N), and force is often represented by the symbol F.

Force plays an important role in classical mechanics. The concept of force is central to all three of Newton's laws of motion. Types of forces often encountered in classical mechanics include elastic, frictional, contact or "normal" forces, and gravitational. The rotational version of force is torque, which produces changes in the rotational speed of an object. In an extended body, each part applies forces on the adjacent parts; the distribution of such forces through the body is the internal mechanical stress. In the case of multiple forces, if the net force on an extended body is zero the body is in equilibrium.

In modern physics, which includes relativity and quantum mechanics, the laws governing motion are revised to rely on fundamental interactions as the ultimate origin of force. However, the understanding of force provided by classical mechanics is useful for practical purposes.

== Development of the concept ==
Philosophers in antiquity used the concept of force in the study of stationary and moving objects and simple machines, but thinkers such as Aristotle and Archimedes retained fundamental errors in understanding force. In part, this was due to an incomplete understanding of the sometimes non-obvious force of friction and a consequently inadequate view of the nature of natural motion. A fundamental error was the belief that a force is required to maintain motion, even at a constant velocity. Most of the previous misunderstandings about motion and force were eventually corrected by Galileo Galilei and Sir Isaac Newton. With his mathematical insight, Newton formulated laws of motion that were not improved for over two hundred years.

By the early 20th century, Einstein developed a theory of relativity that correctly predicted the action of forces on objects with increasing momenta near the speed of light and also provided insight into the forces produced by gravitation and inertia. With modern insights into quantum mechanics and technology that can accelerate particles close to the speed of light, particle physics has devised a Standard Model to describe forces between particles smaller than atoms. The Standard Model predicts that exchanged particles called gauge bosons are the fundamental means by which forces are emitted and absorbed. Only four main interactions are known: in order of decreasing strength, they are: strong, electromagnetic, weak, and gravitational. High-energy particle physics observations made during the 1970s and 1980s confirmed that the weak and electromagnetic forces are expressions of a more fundamental electroweak interaction.

== Pre-Newtonian concepts ==
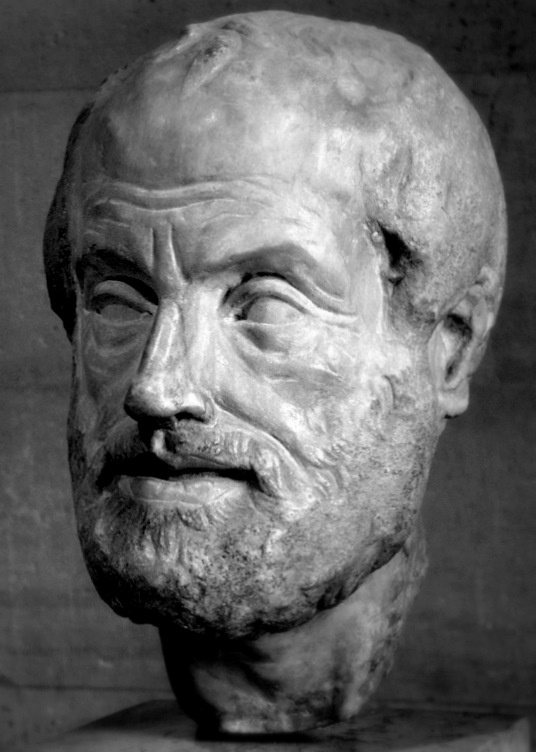
Aristotle famously described a force as anything that causes an object to undergo "unnatural motion"

Since antiquity the concept of force has been recognized as integral to the functioning of each of the simple machines. The mechanical advantage given by a simple machine allowed for less force to be used in exchange for that force acting over a greater distance for the same amount of work. Analysis of the characteristics of forces ultimately culminated in the work of Archimedes who was especially famous for formulating a treatment of buoyant forces inherent in fluids.

Aristotle provided a philosophical discussion of the concept of a force as an integral part of Aristotelian cosmology. In Aristotle's view, the terrestrial sphere contained four elements that come to rest at different "natural places" therein. Aristotle believed that motionless objects on Earth, those composed mostly of the elements earth and water, were in their natural place when on the ground, and that they stay that way if left alone. He distinguished between the innate tendency of objects to find their "natural place" (e.g., for heavy bodies to fall), which led to "natural motion", and unnatural or forced motion, which required continued application of a force. This theory, based on the everyday experience of how objects move, such as the constant application of a force needed to keep a cart moving, had conceptual trouble accounting for the behavior of projectiles, such as the flight of arrows. An archer causes the arrow to move at the start of the flight, and it then sails through the air even though no discernible efficient cause acts upon it. Aristotle was aware of this problem and proposed that the air displaced through the projectile's path carries the projectile to its target. This explanation requires a continuous medium such as air to sustain the motion.

Though Aristotelian physics was criticized as early as the 6th century, its shortcomings would not be corrected until the 17th century work of Galileo Galilei, who was influenced by the late medieval idea that objects in forced motion carried an innate force of impetus. Galileo constructed an experiment in which stones and cannonballs were both rolled down an incline to disprove the Aristotelian theory of motion. He showed that the bodies were accelerated by gravity to an extent that was independent of their mass and argued that objects retain their velocity unless acted on by a force, for example friction. Galileo's idea that force is needed to change motion rather than to sustain it, further improved upon by Isaac Beeckman, René Descartes, and Pierre Gassendi, became a key principle of Newtonian physics.

In the early 17th century, before Newton's Principia, the term "force" (Latin: vis) was applied to many physical and non-physical phenomena, e.g., for an acceleration of a point. The product of a point mass and the square of its velocity was named vis viva (live force) by Leibniz. The modern concept of force corresponds to Newton's vis motrix (accelerating force).

== Newtonian mechanics ==
Sir Isaac Newton described the motion of all objects using the concepts of inertia and force. In 1687, Newton published his magnum opus, Philosophiæ Naturalis Principia Mathematica. In this work Newton set out three laws of motion that have dominated the way forces are described in physics to this day. The precise ways in which Newton's laws are expressed have evolved in step with new mathematical approaches.

=== First law ===
Newton's first law of motion states that the natural behavior of an object at rest is to continue being at rest, and the natural behavior of an object moving at constant speed in a straight line is to continue moving at that constant speed along that straight line. The latter follows from the former because of the principle that the laws of physics are the same for all inertial observers, i.e., all observers who do not feel themselves to be in motion. An observer moving in tandem with an object will see it as being at rest. So, its natural behavior will be to remain at rest with respect to that observer, which means that an observer who sees it moving at constant speed in a straight line will see it continuing to do so.

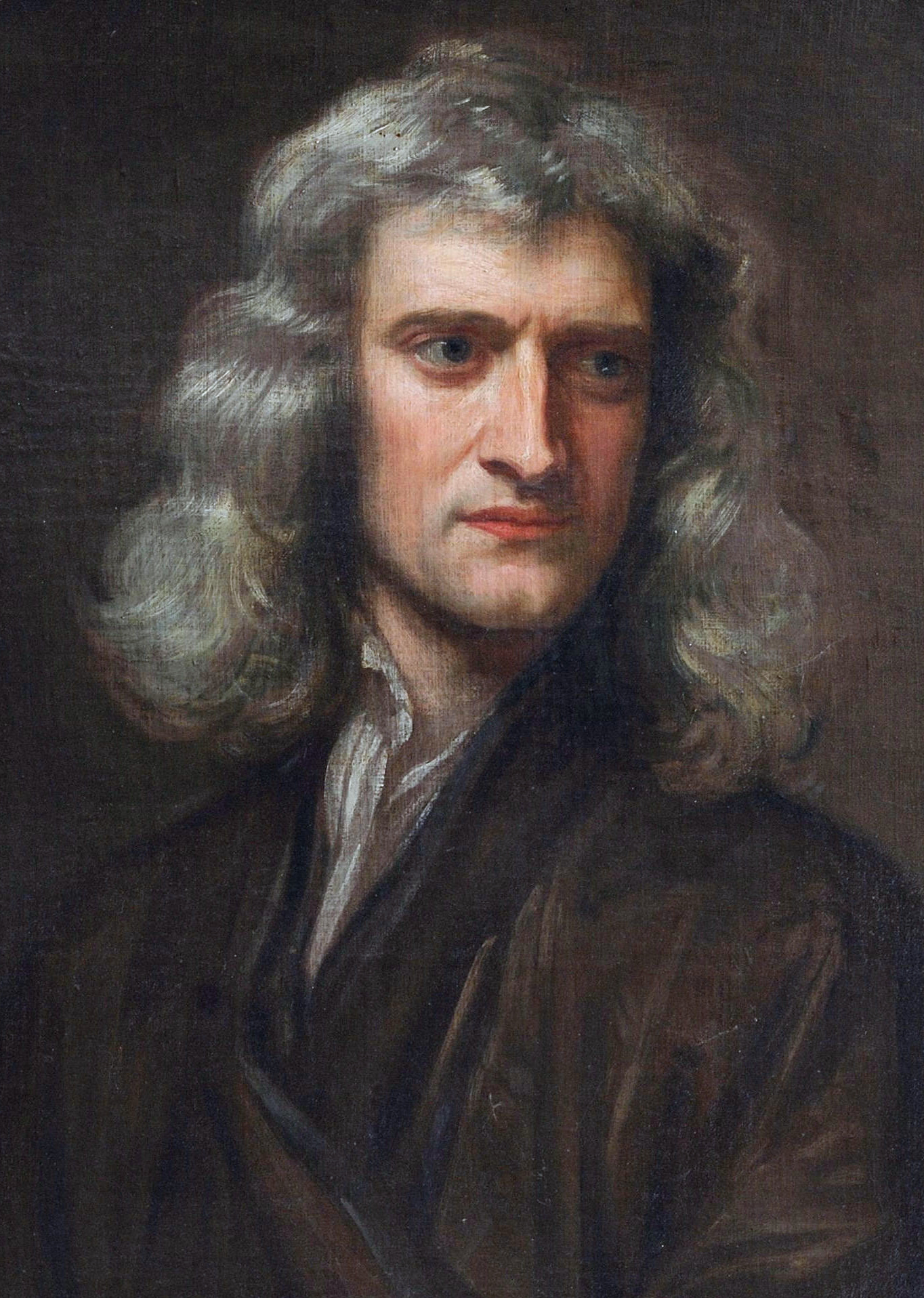
Sir Isaac Newton in 1689. His Principia presented his three laws of motion in geometrical language, whereas modern physics uses differential calculus and vectors.

=== Second law ===
According to the first law, motion at constant speed in a straight line does not need a cause. It is change in motion that requires a cause, and Newton's second law gives the quantitative relationship between force and change of motion. Newton's second law states that the net force acting upon an object is equal to the rate at which its momentum changes with time. If the mass of the object is constant, this law implies that the acceleration of an object is directly proportional to the net force acting on the object, is in the direction of the net force, and is inversely proportional to the mass of the object.

A modern statement of Newton's second law is a vector equation: where $\mathbf{p}$ is the momentum of the system, and $\mathbf{F}$ is the net (vector sum) force. If a body is in equilibrium, there is zero net force by definition (balanced forces may be present nevertheless). In contrast, the second law states that if there is an unbalanced force acting on an object it will result in the object's momentum changing over time.

In common engineering applications the mass in a system remains constant allowing as simple algebraic form for the second law. By the definition of momentum,
$$\mathbf{F} = \frac{\mathrm{d}\mathbf{p}}{\mathrm{d}t} = \frac{\mathrm{d}\left(m\mathbf{v}\right)}{\mathrm{d}t},$$
where m is the mass and $\mathbf{v}$ is the velocity. If Newton's second law is applied to a system of constant mass, m may be moved outside the derivative operator. The equation then becomes
$$\mathbf{F} = m\frac{\mathrm{d}\mathbf{v}}{\mathrm{d}t}.$$
By substituting the definition of acceleration, the algebraic version of Newton's second law is derived:

=== Third law ===
Whenever one body exerts a force on another, the latter simultaneously exerts an equal and opposite force on the first. In vector form, if $\mathbf{F}_{1,2}$ is the force of body 1 on body 2 and $\mathbf{F}_{2,1}$ that of body 2 on body 1, then
$$\mathbf{F}_{1,2}=-\mathbf{F}_{2,1}.$$
This law is sometimes referred to as the action-reaction law, with $\mathbf{F}_{1,2}$ called the action and $-\mathbf{F}_{2,1}$ the reaction.

Newton's third law is a result of applying symmetry to situations where forces can be attributed to the presence of different objects. The third law means that all forces are interactions between different bodies. and thus that there is no such thing as a unidirectional force or a force that acts on only one body.

In a system composed of object 1 and object 2, the net force on the system due to their mutual interactions is zero:
$$\mathbf{F}_{1,2}+\mathbf{F}_{2,1}=0.$$
More generally, in a closed system of particles, all internal forces are balanced. The particles may accelerate with respect to each other but the center of mass of the system will not accelerate. If an external force acts on the system, it will make the center of mass accelerate in proportion to the magnitude of the external force divided by the mass of the system.

Combining Newton's second and third laws, it is possible to show that the linear momentum of a system is conserved in any closed system. In a system of two particles, if $\mathbf{p}_1$ is the momentum of object 1 and $\mathbf{p}_{2}$ the momentum of object 2, then
$$\frac{\mathrm{d}\mathbf{p}_1}{\mathrm{d}t} + \frac{\mathrm{d}\mathbf{p}_2}{\mathrm{d}t}= \mathbf{F}_{1,2} + \mathbf{F}_{2,1} = 0 .$$
Using similar arguments, this can be generalized to a system with an arbitrary number of particles. In general, as long as all forces are due to the interaction of objects with mass, it is possible to define a system such that net momentum is never lost nor gained.

=== Defining "force" ===
Some textbooks use Newton's second law as a definition of force. However, for the equation $\mathbf{F} = m\mathbf{a}$ for a constant mass $m$ to then have any predictive content, it must be combined with further information. Moreover, inferring that a force is present because a body is accelerating is only valid in an inertial frame of reference. The question of which aspects of Newton's laws to take as definitions and which to regard as holding physical content has been answered in various ways, which ultimately do not affect how the theory is used in practice. Notable physicists, philosophers and mathematicians who have sought a more explicit definition of the concept of force include Ernst Mach and Walter Noll.

== Combining forces ==
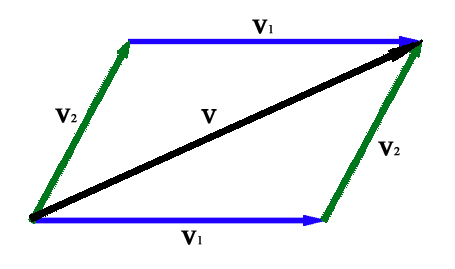
Addition of vectors $v_1$ and $v_2$ results in $v$

Forces act in a particular direction and have sizes dependent upon how strong the push or pull is. Because of these characteristics, forces are classified as "vector quantities". This means that forces follow a different set of mathematical rules than physical quantities that do not have direction (denoted scalar quantities). For example, when determining what happens when two forces act on the same object, it is necessary to know both the magnitude and the direction of both forces to calculate the result. If both of these pieces of information are not known for each force, the situation is ambiguous.

Historically, forces were first quantitatively investigated in conditions of static equilibrium where several forces canceled each other out. Such experiments demonstrate the crucial properties that forces are additive vector quantities: they have magnitude and direction. When two forces act on a point particle, the resulting force, the resultant (also called the net force), can be determined by following the parallelogram rule of vector addition: the addition of two vectors represented by sides of a parallelogram, gives an equivalent resultant vector that is equal in magnitude and direction to the transversal of the parallelogram. The magnitude of the resultant varies from the difference of the magnitudes of the two forces to their sum, depending on the angle between their lines of action.

Free body diagrams of a block on a flat surface and an inclined plane. Forces are resolved and added together to determine their magnitudes and the net force.

Free-body diagrams can be used as a convenient way to keep track of forces acting on a system. Ideally, these diagrams are drawn with the angles and relative magnitudes of the force vectors preserved so that graphical vector addition can be done to determine the net force.

As well as being added, forces can also be resolved into independent components at right angles to each other. A horizontal force pointing northeast can therefore be split into two forces, one pointing north, and one pointing east. Summing these component forces using vector addition yields the original force. Resolving force vectors into components of a set of basis vectors is often a more mathematically clean way to describe forces than using magnitudes and directions. This is because, for orthogonal components, the components of the vector sum are uniquely determined by the scalar addition of the components of the individual vectors. Orthogonal components are independent of each other because forces acting at ninety degrees to each other have no effect on the magnitude or direction of the other. Choosing a set of orthogonal basis vectors is often done by considering what set of basis vectors will make the mathematics most convenient. Choosing a basis vector that is in the same direction as one of the forces is desirable, since that force would then have only one non-zero component. Orthogonal force vectors can be three-dimensional with the third component being at right angles to the other two.

=== Equilibrium ===
When all the forces that act upon an object are balanced, then the object is said to be in a state of equilibrium. Hence, equilibrium occurs when the resultant force acting on a point particle is zero (that is, the vector sum of all forces is zero). When dealing with an extended body, it is also necessary that the net torque be zero. A body is in static equilibrium with respect to a frame of reference if it at rest and not accelerating, whereas a body in dynamic equilibrium is moving at a constant speed in a straight line, i.e., moving but not accelerating. What one observer sees as static equilibrium, another can see as dynamic equilibrium and vice versa.

==== Static ====
Static equilibrium was understood well before the invention of classical mechanics. In an inertial reference frame, objects that are not accelerating have zero net force acting on them.

The simplest case of static equilibrium occurs when two forces are equal in magnitude but opposite in direction. For example, an object on a level surface is pulled (attracted) downward toward the center of the Earth by the force of gravity. At the same time, a force is applied by the surface that resists the downward force with equal upward force (called a normal force). The situation produces zero net force and hence no acceleration.

Pushing against an object that rests on a frictional surface can result in a situation where the object does not move because the applied force is opposed by static friction, generated between the object and the table surface. For a situation with no movement, the static friction force exactly balances the applied force resulting in no acceleration. The static friction increases or decreases in response to the applied force up to an upper limit determined by the characteristics of the contact between the surface and the object.

A static equilibrium between two forces is the most usual way of measuring forces, using simple devices such as weighing scales and spring balances. For example, an object suspended on a vertical spring scale experiences the force of gravity acting on the object balanced by a force applied by the "spring reaction force", which equals the object's weight. Using such tools, some quantitative force laws were discovered: that the force of gravity is proportional to volume for objects of constant density (widely exploited for millennia to define standard weights); Archimedes' principle for buoyancy; Archimedes' analysis of the lever; Boyle's law for gas pressure; and Hooke's law for springs. These were all formulated and experimentally verified before Isaac Newton expounded his three laws of motion.

==== Dynamic ====
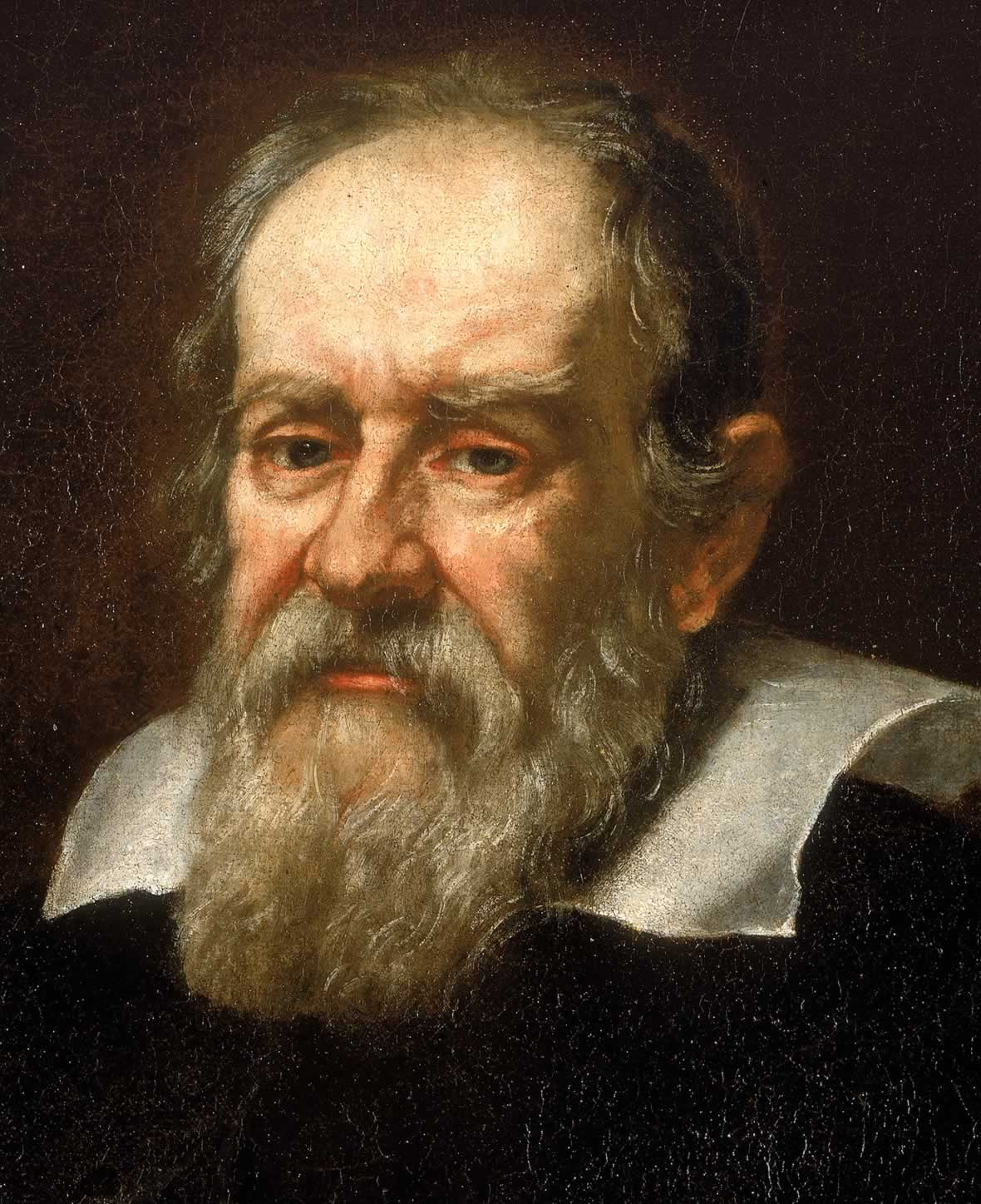
Galileo Galilei was the first to point out the inherent contradictions contained in Aristotle's description of forces.

Dynamic equilibrium was first described by Galileo who noticed that certain assumptions of Aristotelian physics were contradicted by observations and logic. Galileo realized that simple velocity addition demands that the concept of an "absolute rest frame" did not exist. Galileo concluded that motion in a constant velocity was completely equivalent to rest. This was contrary to Aristotle's notion of a "natural state" of rest that objects with mass naturally approached. Simple experiments showed that Galileo's understanding of the equivalence of constant velocity and rest were correct. For example, if a mariner dropped a cannonball from the crow's nest of a ship moving at a constant velocity, Aristotelian physics would have the cannonball fall straight down while the ship moved beneath it. Thus, in an Aristotelian universe, the falling cannonball would land behind the foot of the mast of a moving ship. When this experiment is actually conducted, the cannonball always falls at the foot of the mast, as if the cannonball knows to travel with the ship despite being separated from it. Since there is no forward horizontal force being applied on the cannonball as it falls, the only conclusion left is that the cannonball continues to move with the same velocity as the boat as it falls. Thus, no force is required to keep the cannonball moving at the constant forward velocity.

Moreover, any object traveling at a constant velocity must be subject to zero net force (resultant force). This is the definition of dynamic equilibrium: when all the forces on an object balance but it still moves at a constant velocity. A simple case of dynamic equilibrium occurs in constant velocity motion across a surface with kinetic friction. In such a situation, a force is applied in the direction of motion while the kinetic friction force exactly opposes the applied force. This results in zero net force, but since the object started with a non-zero velocity, it continues to move with a non-zero velocity. Aristotle misinterpreted this motion as being caused by the applied force. When kinetic friction is taken into consideration it is clear that there is no net force causing constant velocity motion.

== Examples of forces in classical mechanics ==
Some forces are consequences of the fundamental ones. In such situations, idealized models can be used to gain physical insight. For example, each solid object is considered a rigid body.

=== Gravitational force or Gravity ===
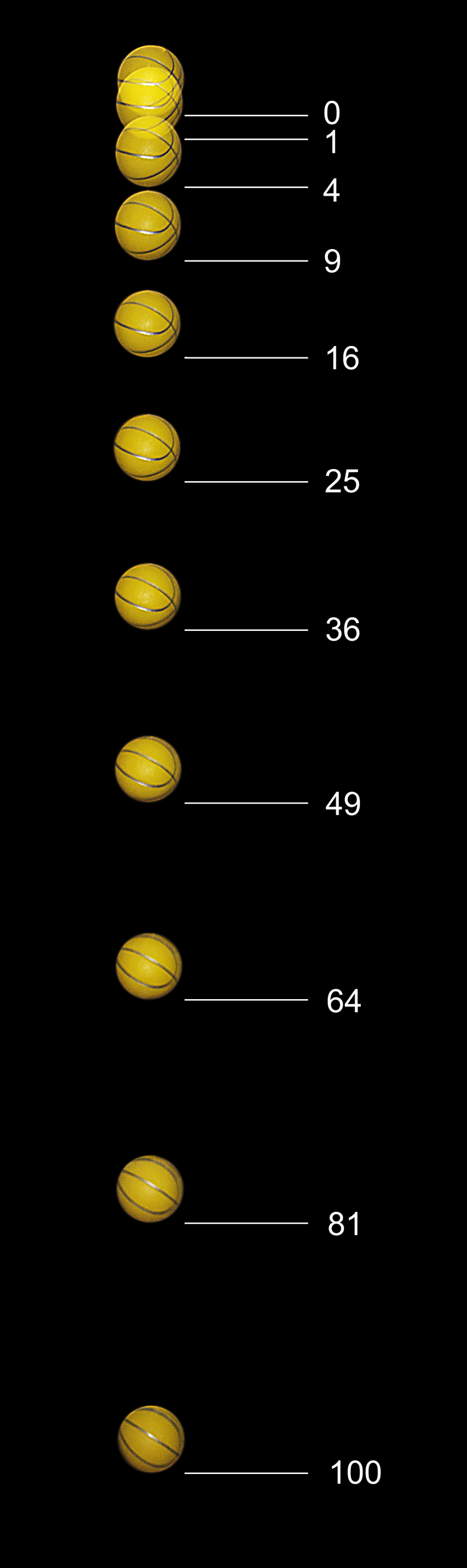
Images of a freely falling basketball taken with a stroboscope at 20 flashes per second. The distance units on the right are multiples of about 12 millimeters. The basketball starts at rest. At the time of the first flash (distance zero) it is released, after which the number of units fallen is equal to the square of the number of flashes.

What we now call gravity was not identified as a universal force until the work of Isaac Newton. Before Newton, the tendency for objects to fall towards the Earth was not understood to be related to the motions of celestial objects. Galileo was instrumental in describing the characteristics of falling objects by determining that the acceleration of every object in free-fall was constant and independent of the mass of the object. Today, this acceleration due to gravity towards the surface of the Earth is usually designated as $\mathbf{g}$ and has a magnitude of about 9.81 meters per second squared (this measurement is taken from sea level and may vary depending on location), and points toward the center of the Earth. This observation means that the force of gravity on an object at the Earth's surface is directly proportional to the object's mass. Thus an object that has a mass of $m$ will experience a force:
$$\mathbf{F} = m\mathbf{g}.$$

For an object in free-fall, this force is unopposed and the net force on the object is its weight. For objects not in free-fall, the force of gravity is opposed by the reaction forces applied by their supports. For example, a person standing on the ground experiences zero net force, since a normal force (a reaction force) is exerted by the ground upward on the person that counterbalances his weight that is directed downward.

Newton's contribution to gravitational theory was to unify the motions of heavenly bodies, which Aristotle had assumed were in a natural state of constant motion, with falling motion observed on the Earth. He proposed a law of gravity that could account for the celestial motions that had been described earlier using Kepler's laws of planetary motion.

Newton came to realize that the effects of gravity might be observed in different ways at larger distances. In particular, Newton determined that the acceleration of the Moon around the Earth could be ascribed to the same force of gravity if the acceleration due to gravity decreased as an inverse square law. Further, Newton realized that the acceleration of a body due to gravity is proportional to the mass of the other attracting body. Combining these ideas gives a formula that relates the mass ($m_\oplus$) and the radius ($R_\oplus$) of the Earth to the gravitational acceleration: where the vector direction is given by $\hat\mathbf{r}$, is the unit vector directed outward from the center of the Earth.

In this equation, a dimensional constant $G$ is used to describe the relative strength of gravity. This constant has come to be known as the Newtonian constant of gravitation, though its value was unknown in Newton's lifetime. Not until 1798 was Henry Cavendish able to make the first measurement of $G$ using a torsion balance; this was widely reported in the press as a measurement of the mass of the Earth since knowing $G$ could allow one to solve for the Earth's mass given the above equation. Newton realized that since all celestial bodies followed the same laws of motion, his law of gravity had to be universal. Succinctly stated, Newton's law of gravitation states that the force on a spherical object of mass $m_1$ due to the gravitational pull of mass $m_2$ is where $r$ is the distance between the two objects' centers of mass and $\hat\mathbf{r}$ is the unit vector pointed in the direction away from the center of the first object toward the center of the second object.

This formula was powerful enough to stand as the basis for all subsequent descriptions of motion within the Solar System until the 20th century. During that time, sophisticated methods of perturbation analysis were invented to calculate the deviations of orbits due to the influence of multiple bodies on a planet, moon, comet, or asteroid. The formalism was exact enough to allow mathematicians to predict the existence of the planet Neptune before it was observed.

=== Electromagnetic ===
The electrostatic force was first described in 1784 by Coulomb as a force that existed intrinsically between two charges. The properties of the electrostatic force were that it varied as an inverse square law directed in the radial direction, was both attractive and repulsive (there was intrinsic polarity), was independent of the mass of the charged objects, and followed the superposition principle. Coulomb's law unifies all these observations into one succinct statement.

Subsequent mathematicians and physicists found the construct of the electric field to be useful for determining the electrostatic force on an electric charge at any point in space. The electric field was based on using a hypothetical "test charge" anywhere in space and then using Coulomb's law to determine the electrostatic force. Thus the electric field anywhere in space is defined as
$$\mathbf{E} = {\mathbf{F} \over{q}},$$
where $q$ is the magnitude of the hypothetical test charge. Similarly, the idea of the magnetic field was introduced to express how magnets can influence one another at a distance. The Lorentz force law gives the force upon a body with charge $q$ due to electric and magnetic fields: where $\mathbf{F}$ is the electromagnetic force, $\mathbf{E}$ is the electric field at the body's location, $\mathbf{B}$ is the magnetic field, and $\mathbf{v}$ is the velocity of the particle. The magnetic contribution to the Lorentz force is the cross product of the velocity vector with the magnetic field.

The origin of electric and magnetic fields would not be fully explained until 1864 when James Clerk Maxwell unified a number of earlier theories into a set of 20 scalar equations, which were later reformulated into 4 vector equations by Oliver Heaviside and Josiah Willard Gibbs. These "Maxwell's equations" fully described the sources of the fields as being stationary and moving charges, and the interactions of the fields themselves. This led Maxwell to discover that electric and magnetic fields could be "self-generating" through a wave that traveled at a speed that he calculated to be the speed of light. This insight united the nascent fields of electromagnetic theory with optics and led directly to a complete description of the electromagnetic spectrum.

=== Normal ===
F_{N} represents the normal force exerted on the object.

When objects are in contact, the force directly between them is called the normal force, the component of the total force in the system exerted normal to the interface between the objects. The normal force is closely related to Newton's third law. The normal force, for example, is responsible for the structural integrity of tables and floors as well as being the force that responds whenever an external force pushes on a solid object. An example of the normal force in action is the impact force on an object crashing into an immobile surface.

=== Friction ===
Friction is a force that opposes relative motion of two bodies. At the macroscopic scale, the frictional force is directly related to the normal force at the point of contact. There are two broad classifications of frictional forces: static friction and kinetic friction.

The static friction force ($\mathbf F_{\mathrm{sf}}$) will exactly oppose forces applied to an object parallel to a surface up to the limit specified by the coefficient of static friction ($\mu_{\mathrm{sf}}$) multiplied by the normal force ($\mathbf F_\text{N}$). In other words, the magnitude of the static friction force satisfies the inequality:
$$0 \le\mathbf F_{\mathrm{sf}} \le \mu_{\mathrm{sf}} \mathbf F_\mathrm{N}.$$

The kinetic friction force ($F_{\mathrm{kf}}$) is typically independent of both the forces applied and the movement of the object. Thus, the magnitude of the force equals:
$$\mathbf F_{\mathrm{kf}} = \mu_{\mathrm{kf}} \mathbf F_\mathrm{N},$$

where $\mu_{\mathrm{kf}}$ is the coefficient of kinetic friction. The coefficient of kinetic friction is normally less than the coefficient of static friction.

=== Tension ===
Tension forces can be modeled using ideal strings that are massless, frictionless, unbreakable, and do not stretch. They can be combined with ideal pulleys, which allow ideal strings to switch physical direction. Ideal strings transmit tension forces instantaneously in action–reaction pairs so that if two objects are connected by an ideal string, any force directed along the string by the first object is accompanied by a force directed along the string in the opposite direction by the second object. By connecting the same string multiple times to the same object through the use of a configuration that uses movable pulleys, the tension force on a load can be multiplied. For every string that acts on a load, another factor of the tension force in the string acts on the load. Such machines allow a mechanical advantage for a corresponding increase in the length of displaced string needed to move the load. These tandem effects result ultimately in the conservation of mechanical energy since the work done on the load is the same no matter how complicated the machine.

=== Spring ===
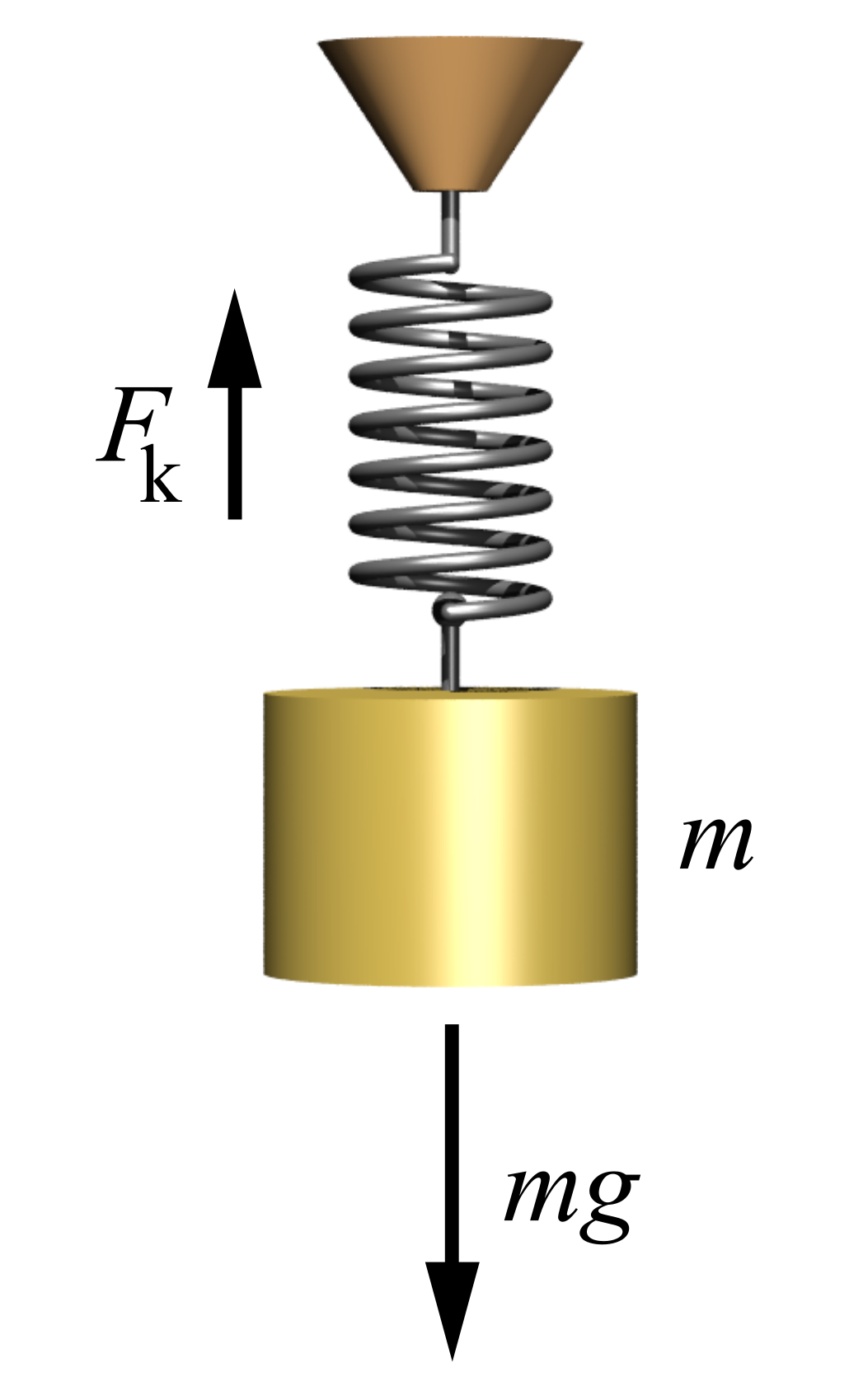
F_{k} is the force that responds to the load on the spring

A simple elastic force acts to return a spring to its natural length. An ideal spring is taken to be massless, frictionless, unbreakable, and infinitely stretchable. Such springs exert forces that push when contracted, or pull when extended, in proportion to the displacement of the spring from its equilibrium position. This linear relationship was described by Robert Hooke in 1676, for whom Hooke's law is named. If $\Delta x$ is the displacement, the force exerted by an ideal spring equals: where $k$ is the spring constant (or force constant), which is particular to the spring. The minus sign accounts for the tendency of the force to act in opposition to the applied load.

=== Centripetal ===
For an object in uniform circular motion, the net force acting on the object equals: where $m$ is the mass of the object, $v$ is the velocity of the object and $r$ is the distance to the center of the circular path and $\hat\mathbf{r}$ is the unit vector pointing in the radial direction outwards from the center. This means that the net force felt by the object is always directed toward the center of the curving path. Such forces act perpendicular to the velocity vector associated with the motion of an object, and therefore do not change the speed of the object (magnitude of the velocity), but only the direction of the velocity vector. More generally, the net force that accelerates an object can be resolved into a component that is perpendicular to the path, and one that is tangential to the path. This yields both the tangential force, which accelerates the object by either slowing it down or speeding it up, and the radial (centripetal) force, which changes its direction.

=== Continuum mechanics ===
When the drag force ($\mathbf F_\text{d}$) associated with air resistance becomes equal in magnitude to the force of gravity on a falling object ($\mathbf F_\text{g}$), the object reaches a state of dynamic equilibrium at terminal velocity.

Newton's laws and Newtonian mechanics in general were first developed to describe how forces affect idealized point particles rather than three-dimensional objects. In real life, matter has extended structure and forces that act on one part of an object might affect other parts of an object. For situations where lattice holding together the atoms in an object is able to flow, contract, expand, or otherwise change shape, the theories of continuum mechanics describe the way forces affect the material. For example, in extended fluids, differences in pressure result in forces being directed along the pressure gradients as follows:
$$\frac{\mathbf{F}}{V} = - \mathbf{\nabla} P,$$

where $V$ is the volume of the object in the fluid and $P$ is the scalar function that describes the pressure at all locations in space. Pressure gradients and differentials result in the buoyant force for fluids suspended in gravitational fields, winds in atmospheric science, and the lift associated with aerodynamics and flight.

A specific instance of such a force that is associated with dynamic pressure is fluid resistance: a body force that resists the motion of an object through a fluid due to viscosity. For so-called "Stokes' drag" the force is approximately proportional to the velocity, but opposite in direction: where:

- $b$ is a constant that depends on the properties of the fluid and the dimensions of the object (usually the cross-sectional area), and
- $\mathbf{v}$ is the velocity of the object.

More formally, forces in continuum mechanics are fully described by a stress tensor with terms that are roughly defined as where $A$ is the relevant cross-sectional area for the volume for which the stress tensor is being calculated. This formalism includes pressure terms associated with forces that act normal to the cross-sectional area (the matrix diagonals of the tensor) as well as shear terms associated with forces that act parallel to the cross-sectional area (the off-diagonal elements). The stress tensor accounts for forces that cause all strains (deformations) including also tensile stresses and compressions.

=== Fictitious ===
There are forces that are frame dependent, meaning that they appear due to the adoption of non-Newtonian (that is, non-inertial) reference frames. Such forces include the centrifugal force and the Coriolis force. These forces are considered fictitious because they do not exist in frames of reference that are not accelerating. Because these forces are not genuine they are also referred to as "pseudo forces".

In general relativity, gravity becomes a fictitious force that arises in situations where spacetime deviates from a flat geometry.

== Concepts derived from force ==
=== Rotation and torque ===
Relationship between force (F), torque (τ), and momentum vectors (p and L) in a rotating system.

Forces that cause extended objects to rotate are associated with torques. Mathematically, the torque of a force $\mathbf{F}$ is defined relative to an arbitrary reference point as the cross product: where $\mathbf{r}$ is the position vector of the force application point relative to the reference point.

Torque is the rotation equivalent of force in the same way that angle is the rotational equivalent for position, angular velocity for velocity, and angular momentum for momentum. As a consequence of Newton's first law of motion, there exists rotational inertia that ensures that all bodies maintain their angular momentum unless acted upon by an unbalanced torque. Likewise, Newton's second law of motion can be used to derive an analogous equation for the instantaneous angular acceleration of the rigid body:
$$\boldsymbol\tau = I\boldsymbol\alpha,$$
where

- $I$ is the moment of inertia of the body
- $\boldsymbol\alpha$ is the angular acceleration of the body.

This provides a definition for the moment of inertia, which is the rotational equivalent for mass. In more advanced treatments of mechanics, where the rotation over a time interval is described, the moment of inertia must be substituted by the tensor that, when properly analyzed, fully determines the characteristics of rotations including precession and nutation.

Equivalently, the differential form of Newton's second law provides an alternative definition of torque:
$$\boldsymbol\tau = \frac{\mathrm{d}\mathbf{L}}{\mathrm{dt}},$$
where $\mathbf{L}$ is the angular momentum of the particle.

Newton's third law of motion requires that all objects exerting torques themselves experience equal and opposite torques, and therefore also directly implies the conservation of angular momentum for closed systems that experience rotations and revolutions through the action of internal torques.

=== Yank ===
The yank is defined as the rate of change of force

$$\mathbf Y = \frac{\mathrm d\mathbf F}{\mathrm dt}$$

The term is used in biomechanical analysis, athletic assessment and robotic control. The second ("tug"), third ("snatch"), fourth ("shake"), and higher derivatives are rarely used.

=== Kinematic integrals ===
Forces can be used to define a number of physical concepts by integrating with respect to kinematic variables. For example, integrating with respect to time gives the definition of impulse:
$$\mathbf{J}=\int_{t_1}^{t_2}{\mathbf{F} \, \mathrm{d}t},$$
which by Newton's second law must be equivalent to the change in momentum (yielding the Impulse momentum theorem).

Similarly, integrating with respect to position gives a definition for the work done by a force: which is equivalent to changes in kinetic energy (yielding the work energy theorem).

Power P is the rate of change dW/dt of the work W, as the trajectory is extended by a position change $d\mathbf{x}$ in a time interval dt:
$$\mathrm{d}W = \frac{\mathrm{d}W}{\mathrm{d}\mathbf{x}} \cdot \mathrm{d}\mathbf{x} = \mathbf{F} \cdot \mathrm{d}\mathbf{x},$$
so
$$P = \frac{\mathrm{d}W}{\mathrm{d}t} = \frac{\mathrm{d}W}{\mathrm{d}\mathbf{x}} \cdot \frac{\mathrm{d}\mathbf{x}}{\mathrm{d}t} = \mathbf{F} \cdot \mathbf{v},$$
with the velocity.

=== Potential energy ===
Instead of a force, often the mathematically related concept of a potential energy field is used. For instance, the gravitational force acting upon an object can be seen as the action of the gravitational field that is present at the object's location. Restating mathematically the definition of energy (via the definition of work), a potential scalar field $U(\mathbf{r})$ is defined as that field whose gradient is equal and opposite to the force produced at every point:
$$\mathbf{F}=-\mathbf{\nabla} U.$$

Forces can be classified as conservative or nonconservative. Conservative forces are equivalent to the gradient of a potential while nonconservative forces are not.

=== Conservation ===
A conservative force that acts on a closed system has an associated mechanical work that allows energy to convert only between kinetic or potential forms. This means that for a closed system, the net mechanical energy is conserved whenever a conservative force acts on the system. The force, therefore, is related directly to the difference in potential energy between two different locations in space, and can be considered to be an artifact of the potential field in the same way that the direction and amount of a flow of water can be considered to be an artifact of the contour map of the elevation of an area.

Conservative forces include gravity, the electromagnetic force, and the spring force. Each of these forces has models that are dependent on a position often given as a radial vector $\mathbf{r}$ emanating from spherically symmetric potentials. Examples of this follow:

For gravity:
$$\mathbf{F}_\text{g} = - \frac{G m_1 m_2}{r^2} \hat\mathbf{r},$$
where $G$ is the gravitational constant, and $m_n$ is the mass of object n.

For electrostatic forces:
$$\mathbf{F}_\text{e} = \frac{q_1 q_2}{4 \pi \varepsilon_{0} r^2} \hat\mathbf{r},$$
where $\varepsilon_{0}$ is electric permittivity of free space, and $q_n$ is the electric charge of object n.

For spring forces:
$$\mathbf{F}_\text{s} = -kr\hat\mathbf{r},$$
where $k$ is the spring constant.

For certain physical scenarios, it is impossible to model forces as being due to a simple gradient of potentials. This is often due a macroscopic statistical average of microstates. For example, static friction is caused by the gradients of numerous electrostatic potentials between the atoms, but manifests as a force model that is independent of any macroscale position vector. Nonconservative forces other than friction include other contact forces, tension, compression, and drag. For any sufficiently detailed description, all these forces are the results of conservative ones since each of these macroscopic forces are the net results of the gradients of microscopic potentials.

The connection between macroscopic nonconservative forces and microscopic conservative forces is described by detailed treatment with statistical mechanics. In macroscopic closed systems, nonconservative forces act to change the internal energies of the system, and are often associated with the transfer of heat. According to the Second law of thermodynamics, nonconservative forces necessarily result in energy transformations within closed systems from ordered to more random conditions as entropy increases.

== Units ==
The SI unit of force is the newton (symbol N), which is the force required to accelerate a one kilogram mass at a rate of one meter per second squared, or kg·m·s^{−2}.The corresponding CGS unit is the dyne, the force required to accelerate a one gram mass by one centimeter per second squared, or g·cm·s^{−2}. A newton is thus equal to 100,000 dynes.

The gravitational foot-pound-second English unit of force is the pound-force (lbf), defined as the force exerted by gravity on a pound-mass in the standard gravitational field of 9.80665 m·s^{−2}. The pound-force provides an alternative unit of mass: one slug is the mass that will accelerate by one foot per second squared when acted on by one pound-force. An alternative unit of force in a different foot–pound–second system, the absolute fps system, is the poundal, defined as the force required to accelerate a one-pound mass at a rate of one foot per second squared.

The pound-force has a metric counterpart, less commonly used than the newton: the kilogram-force (kgf) (sometimes kilopond), is the force exerted by standard gravity on one kilogram of mass. The kilogram-force leads to an alternate, but rarely used unit of mass: the metric slug (sometimes mug or hyl) is that mass that accelerates at 1 m·s^{−2} when subjected to a force of 1 kgf. The kilogram-force is not a part of the modern SI system, and is generally deprecated, sometimes used for expressing aircraft weight, jet thrust, bicycle spoke tension, torque wrench settings and engine output torque.

Force units
	Newtons	Dynes	Kilograms-force kiloponds	Pounds	Poundals
1 N	≡ 1 kg⋅m/s^{2}	= 100000 dyn	≈ 0.10197 kgf	≈ 0.22481 lb	≈ 7.23301 pdl
1 dyn	= 1×10^{−5} N	≡ 1 g⋅cm/s^{2}	≈ 1.01972×10^{−6} kgf	≈ 2.24809×10^{−6} lb	≈ 7.23301×10^{−5} pdl
1 kgf	= 9.80665 N	= 980665 dyn	≡ g_{n} × 1 kg	≈ 2.20462 lb	≈ 70.9316 pdl
1 lb	≈ 4.44822 N	≈ 444822 dyn	≈ 0.45359 kgf	≡ g_{n} × 1 lb_{m} / .3048 m/ft	≈ 32.1740 pdl
1 pdl	≈ 0.13825 N	≈ 13825.5 dyn	≈ 0.01410 kgf	≈ 0.03108 lbf	≡ 1 lb_{m}⋅ft/s^{2}

See also Ton-force.

== Revisions of the force concept ==
At the beginning of the 20th century, new physical ideas emerged to explain experimental results in astronomical and submicroscopic realms. As discussed below, relativity alters the definition of momentum and quantum mechanics reuses the concept of "force" in microscopic contexts where Newton's laws do not apply directly.

=== Special theory of relativity ===
In the special theory of relativity, mass and energy are equivalent (as can be seen by calculating the work required to accelerate an object). When an object's velocity increases, so does its energy and hence its mass equivalent (inertia). It thus requires more force to accelerate it the same amount than it did at a lower velocity. Newton's second law,
$$\mathbf{F} = \frac{\mathrm{d}\mathbf{p}}{\mathrm{d}t},$$
remains valid because it is a mathematical definition. But for momentum to be conserved at relativistic relative velocity, $v$, momentum must be redefined as:
$$\mathbf{p} = \frac{m_0\mathbf{v}}{\sqrt{1 - v^2/c^2}} ,$$
where $m_0$ is the rest mass and $c$ the speed of light.

The expression relating force and acceleration for a particle with constant non-zero rest mass $m$ moving in the $x$ direction at velocity $v$ is:
$$\mathbf{F} = \left(\gamma^3 m a_x, \gamma m a_y, \gamma m a_z\right),$$
where is called the Lorentz factor. The Lorentz factor increases steeply as the relative velocity approaches the speed of light. Consequently, the greater and greater force must be applied to produce the same acceleration at extreme velocity. The relative velocity cannot reach $c$. If $v$ is very small compared to $c$, then $\gamma$ is very close to 1 and
$$\mathbf F = m\mathbf a$$
is a close approximation. Even for use in relativity, one can restore the form of
$$F^\mu = mA^\mu$$
through the use of four-vectors. This relation is correct in relativity when $F^\mu$ is the four-force, $m$ is the invariant mass, and $A^\mu$ is the four-acceleration.

The general theory of relativity incorporates a more radical departure from the Newtonian way of thinking about force, specifically gravitational force. This reimagining of the nature of gravity is described more fully below.

=== Quantum mechanics ===
Quantum mechanics is a theory of physics originally developed in order to understand microscopic phenomena: behavior at the scale of molecules, atoms or subatomic particles. Generally and loosely speaking, the smaller a system is, the more an adequate mathematical model will require understanding quantum effects. The conceptual underpinning of quantum physics is different from that of classical physics. Instead of thinking about quantities like position, momentum, and energy as properties that an object has, one considers what result might appear when a measurement of a chosen type is performed. Quantum mechanics allows the physicist to calculate the probability that a chosen measurement will elicit a particular result. The expectation value for a measurement is the average of the possible results it might yield, weighted by their probabilities of occurrence.

In quantum mechanics, interactions are typically described in terms of energy rather than force. The Ehrenfest theorem provides a connection between quantum expectation values and the classical concept of force, a connection that is necessarily inexact, as quantum physics is fundamentally different from classical. In quantum physics, the Born rule is used to calculate the expectation values of a position measurement or a momentum measurement. These expectation values will generally change over time; that is, depending on the time at which (for example) a position measurement is performed, the probabilities for its different possible outcomes will vary. The Ehrenfest theorem says, roughly speaking, that the equations describing how these expectation values change over time have a form reminiscent of Newton's second law, with a force defined as the negative derivative of the potential energy. However, the more pronounced quantum effects are in a given situation, the more difficult it is to derive meaningful conclusions from this resemblance.

Quantum mechanics also introduces two new constraints that interact with forces at the submicroscopic scale and which are especially important for atoms. Despite the strong attraction of the nucleus, the uncertainty principle limits the minimum extent of an electron probability distribution and the Pauli exclusion principle prevents electrons from sharing the same probability distribution. This gives rise to an emergent pressure known as degeneracy pressure. The dynamic equilibrium between the degeneracy pressure and the attractive electromagnetic force give atoms, molecules, liquids, and solids stability.

=== Quantum field theory ===
Feynman diagram for the decay of a neutron into a proton. The W boson is between two vertices indicating a repulsion.

In modern particle physics, forces and the acceleration of particles are explained as a mathematical by-product of exchange of momentum-carrying gauge bosons. With the development of quantum field theory and general relativity, it was realized that force is a redundant concept arising from conservation of momentum (4-momentum in relativity and momentum of virtual particles in quantum electrodynamics). The conservation of momentum can be directly derived from the homogeneity or symmetry of space and so is usually considered more fundamental than the concept of a force. Thus the currently known fundamental forces are considered more accurately to be "fundamental interactions".

While sophisticated mathematical descriptions are needed to predict, in full detail, the result of such interactions, there is a conceptually simple way to describe them through the use of Feynman diagrams. In a Feynman diagram, each matter particle is represented as a straight line (see world line) traveling through time, which normally increases up or to the right in the diagram. Matter and anti-matter particles are identical except for their direction of propagation through the Feynman diagram. World lines of particles intersect at interaction vertices, and the Feynman diagram represents any force arising from an interaction as occurring at the vertex with an associated instantaneous change in the direction of the particle world lines. Gauge bosons are emitted away from the vertex as wavy lines and, in the case of virtual particle exchange, are absorbed at an adjacent vertex. The utility of Feynman diagrams is that other types of physical phenomena that are part of the general picture of fundamental interactions but are conceptually separate from forces can also be described using the same rules. For example, a Feynman diagram can describe in succinct detail how a neutron decays into an electron, proton, and antineutrino, an interaction mediated by the same gauge boson that is responsible for the weak nuclear force.

== Fundamental interactions ==
All of the known forces of the universe are classified into four fundamental interactions. The strong and the weak forces act only at very short distances, and are responsible for the interactions between subatomic particles, including nucleons and compound nuclei. The electromagnetic force acts between electric charges, and the gravitational force acts between masses. All other forces in nature derive from these four fundamental interactions operating within quantum mechanics, including the constraints introduced by the Schrödinger equation and the Pauli exclusion principle. For example, friction is a manifestation of the electromagnetic force acting between atoms of two surfaces. The forces in springs, modeled by Hooke's law, are also the result of electromagnetic forces. Centrifugal forces are acceleration forces that arise simply from the acceleration of rotating frames of reference.

The fundamental theories for forces developed from the unification of different ideas. For example, Newton's universal theory of gravitation showed that the force responsible for objects falling near the surface of the Earth is also the force responsible for the falling of celestial bodies about the Earth (the Moon) and around the Sun (the planets). Michael Faraday and James Clerk Maxwell demonstrated that electric and magnetic forces were unified through a theory of electromagnetism. In the 20th century, the development of quantum mechanics led to a modern understanding that the first three fundamental forces (all except gravity) are manifestations of matter (fermions) interacting by exchanging virtual particles called gauge bosons. This Standard Model of particle physics assumes a similarity between the forces and led scientists to predict the unification of the weak and electromagnetic forces in electroweak theory, which was subsequently confirmed by observation.

The four fundamental forces of nature
Property/Interaction	Gravitation	Weak	Electromagnetic	Strong	
Property/Interaction	Gravitation	(Electroweak)		Fundamental	Residual
Acts on:	Mass - Energy	Flavor	Electric charge	Color charge	Atomic nuclei
Particles experiencing:	All	Quarks, leptons	Electrically charged	Quarks, gluons	Hadrons
Particles mediating:	Graviton (not yet observed)	W^{+}, W^{−}, Z^{0}	photon (γ)	Gluons (g)	Mesons
Strength in the scale of quarks:	10^{−41}	10^{−4}	1	60	Not applicable to quarks
Strength in the scale of protons/neutrons:	10^{−36}	10^{−7}	1	Not applicable to hadrons	20

=== Gravitational ===
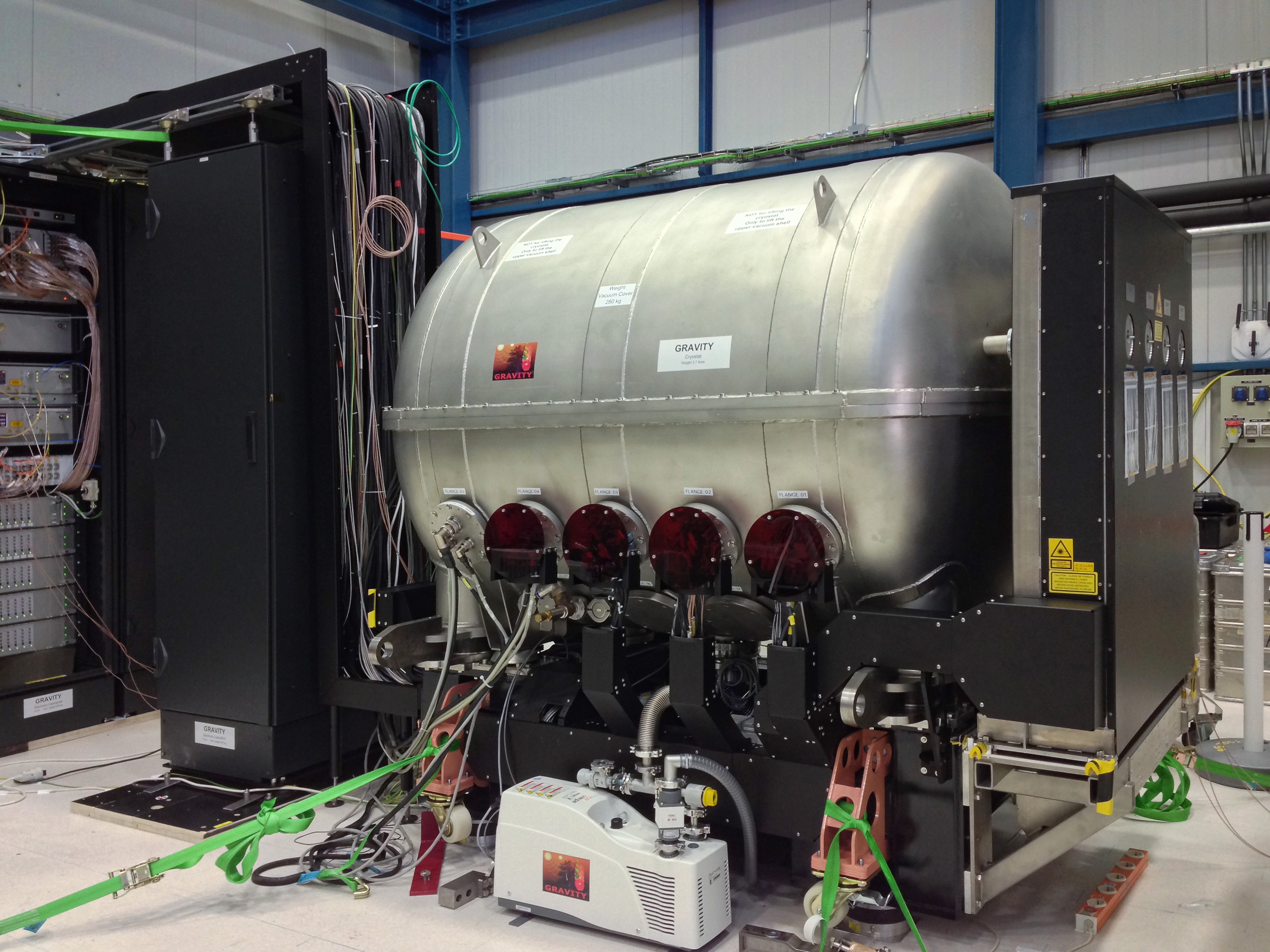
Instruments like GRAVITY provide a powerful probe for gravity force detection.

Newton's law of gravitation is an example of action at a distance: one body, like the Sun, exerts an influence upon any other body, like the Earth, no matter how far apart they are. Moreover, this action at a distance is instantaneous. According to Newton's theory, the one body shifting position changes the gravitational pulls felt by all other bodies, all at the same instant of time. Albert Einstein recognized that this was inconsistent with special relativity and its prediction that influences cannot travel faster than the speed of light. So, he sought a new theory of gravitation that would be relativistically consistent. Mercury's orbit did not match that predicted by Newton's law of gravitation. Some astrophysicists predicted the existence of an undiscovered planet (Vulcan) that could explain the discrepancies. When Einstein formulated his theory of general relativity (GR) he focused on Mercury's problematic orbit and found that his theory added a correction, which could account for the discrepancy. This was the first time that Newton's theory of gravity had been shown to be inexact.

Since then, general relativity has been acknowledged as the theory that best explains gravity. In GR, gravitation is not viewed as a force, but rather, objects moving freely in gravitational fields travel under their own inertia in straight lines through curved spacetime – defined as the shortest spacetime path between two spacetime events. From the perspective of the object, all motion occurs as if there were no gravitation whatsoever. It is only when observing the motion in a global sense that the curvature of spacetime can be observed and the force is inferred from the object's curved path. Thus, the straight line path in spacetime is seen as a curved line in space, and it is called the ballistic trajectory of the object. For example, a basketball thrown from the ground moves in a parabola, as it is in a uniform gravitational field. Its spacetime trajectory is almost a straight line, slightly curved (with the radius of curvature of the order of few light-years). The time derivative of the changing momentum of the object is what we label as "gravitational force".

=== Electromagnetic ===
Maxwell's equations and the set of techniques built around them adequately describe a wide range of physics involving force in electricity and magnetism. This classical theory already includes relativity effects. Understanding quantized electromagnetic interactions between elementary particles requires quantum electrodynamics (QED). In QED, photons are fundamental exchange particles, describing all interactions relating to electromagnetism including the electromagnetic force.

=== Strong nuclear ===
There are two "nuclear forces", which today are usually described as interactions that take place in quantum theories of particle physics. The strong nuclear force is the force responsible for the structural integrity of atomic nuclei, and gains its name from its ability to overpower the electromagnetic repulsion between protons.

The strong force is today understood to represent the interactions between quarks and gluons as detailed by the theory of quantum chromodynamics (QCD). The strong force is the fundamental force mediated by gluons, acting upon quarks, antiquarks, and the gluons themselves. The strong force only acts directly upon elementary particles. A residual is observed between hadrons (notably, the nucleons in atomic nuclei), known as the nuclear force. Here the strong force acts indirectly, transmitted as gluons that form part of the virtual pi and rho mesons, the classical transmitters of the nuclear force. The failure of many searches for free quarks has shown that the elementary particles affected are not directly observable. This phenomenon is called color confinement.

=== Weak nuclear ===
Unique among the fundamental interactions, the weak nuclear force creates no bound states. The weak force is due to the exchange of the heavy W and Z bosons. Since the weak force is mediated by two types of bosons, it can be divided into two types of interaction or "vertices" — charged current, involving the electrically charged W^{+} and W^{−} bosons, and neutral current, involving electrically neutral Z^{0} bosons. The most familiar effect of weak interaction is beta decay (of neutrons in atomic nuclei) and the associated radioactivity. This is a type of charged-current interaction. The word "weak" derives from the fact that the field strength is some 10^{13} times less than that of the strong force. Still, it is stronger than gravity over short distances. A consistent electroweak theory has also been developed, which shows that electromagnetic forces and the weak force are indistinguishable at a temperature in excess of approximately 10^{15} K. Such temperatures occurred in the plasma collisions in the early moments of the Big Bang.

== See also ==
- Contact force – Force between two objects that are in physical contact
- Force control – Aspect of robotics
- Force gauge – Instrument for measuring force
- Orders of magnitude (force) – Comparison of a wide range of physical forces
- Parallel force system – Situation in mechanical engineering
- Rigid body – Physical object which does not deform when forces or moments are exerted on it
- Specific force – Concept in physics

Linear/translational quantities				Angular/rotational quantities			
Dimensions	1	L	L^{2}	Dimensions	1	θ	θ^{2}
T	time: t s	absement: A m s		T	time: t s		
1		distance: d, position: r, s, x, displacement: d m	area: A m^{2}	1		angle: θ, angular displacement: θ rad	solid angle: Ω rad^{2}, sr
T^{−1}	frequency: f s^{−1}, Hz	speed: v, velocity: v m s^{−1}	kinematic viscosity: ν, specific angular momentum: h m^{2} s^{−1}	T^{−1}	frequency: f, rotational speed: n, rotational velocity: n s^{−1}, Hz	angular speed: ω, angular velocity: ω rad s^{−1}	
T^{−2}		acceleration: a m s^{−2}		T^{−2}	rotational acceleration s^{−2}	angular acceleration: α rad s^{−2}	
T^{−3}		jerk: j m s^{−3}		T^{−3}		angular jerk: ζ rad s^{−3}	
M	mass: m kg	weighted position: M ⟨x⟩ = ∑ m x	moment of inertia: I kg m^{2}	ML			
MT^{−1}	Mass flow rate: $\dot{m}$ kg s^{−1}	momentum: p, impulse: J kg m s^{−1}, N s	action: 𝒮, actergy: ℵ kg m^{2} s^{−1}, J s	MLT^{−1}		angular momentum: L, angular impulse: ΔL kg m rad s^{−1}	
MT^{−2}		force: F, weight: F_{g} kg m s^{−2}, N	energy: E, work: W, Lagrangian: L kg m^{2} s^{−2}, J	MLT^{−2}		torque: τ, moment: M kg m rad s^{−2}, N m	
MT^{−3}		yank: Y kg m s^{−3}, N s^{−1}	power: P kg m^{2} s^{−3}, W	MLT^{−3}		rotatum: P kg m rad s^{−3}, N m s^{−1}	
