= Closed system =

Type of system

A closed system is a natural physical system that does not allow transfer of matter in or out of the system, although the transfer of energy is allowed in the contexts of certain fields (e.g. physics, chemistry, engineering, etc).

== Physics ==
=== In classical mechanics ===
In nonrelativistic classical mechanics, a closed system is a physical system that does not exchange any matter with its surroundings, and is not subject to any net force whose source is external to the system. A closed system in classical mechanics would be equivalent to an isolated system in thermodynamics. Closed systems are often used to limit the factors that can affect the results of a specific problem or experiment.

=== In thermodynamics ===
Properties of isolated, closed, and open systems in exchanging energy and matter

In thermodynamics, a closed system can exchange energy (as heat or work) but not matter, with its surroundings. An isolated system cannot exchange any heat, work, or matter with the surroundings, while an open system can exchange energy and matter. (This scheme of definition of terms is not uniformly used, though it is convenient for some purposes. In particular, some writers use 'closed system' where 'isolated system' is used here.)

For a simple system, with only one type of particle (atom or molecule), a closed system amounts to a constant number of particles. However, for systems which are undergoing a chemical reaction, there may be all sorts of molecules being generated and destroyed by the reaction process. In this case, the fact that the system is closed is expressed by stating that the total number of each elemental atom is conserved, no matter what kind of molecule it may be a part of. Mathematically:

$$\sum_{j=1}^m a_{ij}N_j=b_i$$

where $N_j$ is the number of j-type molecules, $a_{ij}$ is the number of atoms of element $i$ in molecule $j$ and $b_i$ is the total number of atoms of element $i$ in the system, which remains constant, since the system is closed. There will be one such equation for each different element in the system.

In thermodynamics, a closed system is important for solving complicated thermodynamic problems. It allows the elimination of some external factors that could alter the results of the experiment or problem thus simplifying it. A closed system can also be used in situations where thermodynamic equilibrium is required to simplify the situation.

=== In quantum physics ===
This equation, called Schrödinger's equation, describes the behavior of an isolated or closed quantum system, that is, by definition, a system which does not interchange information (i.e. energy and/or matter) with another system. So if an isolated system is in some pure state |ψ(t) ∈ H at time t, where H denotes the Hilbert space of the system, the time evolution of this state (between two consecutive measurements).

$$i\hbar \frac{\partial}{\partial t} \Psi(\mathbf{r}, t) = \hat{H} \Psi(\mathbf{r}, t)$$

where i is the imaginary unit, ħ is the Planck constant divided by 2π, the symbol ∂/∂t indicates a partial derivative with respect to time t, Ψ (the Greek letter psi) is the wave function of the quantum system, and Ĥ is the Hamiltonian operator (which characterizes the total energy of any given wave function and takes different forms depending on the situation).

== In chemistry ==
In chemistry, a closed system is where no reactants or products can escape, only heat can be exchanged freely (e.g. an ice cooler). A closed system can be used when conducting chemical experiments where temperature is not a factor (i.e. reaching thermal equilibrium).

== In engineering ==
In an engineering context, a closed system is a bound system, i.e. defined, in which every input is known and every resultant is known (or can be known) within a specific time.

== See also ==
- Glossary of systems theory
- Dynamical system
- Isolated system
- Open system (systems theory)
- Sense and Respond
- Thermodynamic system
