= Zeroth law of thermodynamics =

Physical law for definition of temperature

The zeroth law of thermodynamics is one of the four principal laws of thermodynamics. It provides an independent definition of temperature without reference to entropy, which is defined in the second law. The law was established by Ralph H. Fowler in the 1930s, long after the first, second, and third laws had been widely recognized.

The zeroth law states that if two thermodynamic systems are both in thermal equilibrium with a third system, then the two systems are in thermal equilibrium with each other.

Two systems are said to be in thermal equilibrium if they are linked by a wall permeable only to heat, and they do not change over time.

Another formulation by James Clerk Maxwell is "All heat is of the same kind". Another statement of the law is "All diathermal walls are equivalent".

The zeroth law is important for the mathematical formulation of thermodynamics. It makes the relation of thermal equilibrium between systems an equivalence relation, which can represent equality of some quantity associated with each system. A quantity that is the same for two systems, if they can be placed in thermal equilibrium with each other, is a scale of temperature. The zeroth law is needed for the definition of such scales, and justifies the use of practical thermometers.

== Equivalence relation ==
A thermodynamic system is by definition in its own state of internal thermodynamic equilibrium, that is to say, there is no change in its observable state (i.e. macrostate) over time and no flows occur in it. One precise statement of the zeroth law is that the relation of thermal equilibrium is an equivalence relation on pairs of thermodynamic systems. In other words, the set of all systems each in its own state of internal thermodynamic equilibrium may be divided into subsets in which every system belongs to one and only one subset, and is in thermal equilibrium with every other member of that subset, and is not in thermal equilibrium with a member of any other subset. This means that a unique "tag" can be assigned to every system, and if the "tags" of two systems are the same, they are in thermal equilibrium with each other, and if different, they are not. This property is used to justify the use of empirical temperature as a tagging system. Empirical temperature provides further relations of thermally equilibrated systems, such as order and continuity with regard to "hotness" or "coldness", but these are not implied by the standard statement of the zeroth law.

If it is defined that a thermodynamic system is in thermal equilibrium with itself (i.e., thermal equilibrium is reflexive), then the zeroth law may be stated as follows:

If a body C, be in thermal equilibrium with two other bodies, A and B, then A and B are in thermal equilibrium with one another.

This statement asserts that thermal equilibrium is a left-Euclidean relation between thermodynamic systems. If we also define that every thermodynamic system is in thermal equilibrium with itself, then thermal equilibrium is also a reflexive relation. Binary relations that are both reflexive and Euclidean are equivalence relations. Thus, again implicitly assuming reflexivity, the zeroth law is therefore often expressed as a right-Euclidean statement:

If two systems are in thermal equilibrium with a third system, then they are in thermal equilibrium with each other.

One consequence of an equivalence relationship is that the equilibrium relationship is symmetric: If A is in thermal equilibrium with B, then B is in thermal equilibrium with A. Thus, the two systems are in thermal equilibrium with each other, or they are in mutual equilibrium. Another consequence of equivalence is that thermal equilibrium is described as a transitive relation:

If A is in thermal equilibrium with B and if B is in thermal equilibrium with C, then A is in thermal equilibrium with C.

A reflexive, transitive relation does not guarantee an equivalence relationship. For the above statement to be true, both reflexivity and symmetry must be implicitly assumed.

It is the Euclidean relationships which apply directly to thermometry. An ideal thermometer is a thermometer which does not measurably change the state of the system it is measuring. Assuming that the unchanging reading of an ideal thermometer is a valid tagging system for the equivalence classes of a set of equilibrated thermodynamic systems, then the systems are in thermal equilibrium, if a thermometer gives the same reading for each system. If the system are thermally connected, no subsequent change in the state of either one can occur. If the readings are different, then thermally connecting the two systems causes a change in the states of both systems. The zeroth law provides no information regarding this final reading.

== Foundation of temperature ==
Nowadays, there are two nearly separate concepts of temperature: the thermodynamic concept, and that of the kinetic theory of gases and other materials.

The zeroth law belongs to the thermodynamic concept, but this is no longer the primary international definition of temperature. The current primary international definition of temperature is in terms of the kinetic energy of freely moving microscopic particles such as molecules, related to temperature through the Boltzmann constant $k_{\mathrm B}$. The present article is about the thermodynamic concept, not about the kinetic theory concept.

The zeroth law establishes thermal equilibrium as an equivalence relationship. An equivalence relationship on a set (such as the set of all systems each in its own state of internal thermodynamic equilibrium) divides that set into a collection of distinct subsets ("disjoint subsets") where any member of the set is a member of one and only one such subset. In the case of the zeroth law, these subsets consist of systems which are in mutual equilibrium. This partitioning allows any member of the subset to be uniquely "tagged" with a label identifying the subset to which it belongs. Although the labeling may be quite arbitrary, temperature is just such a labeling process which uses the real number system for tagging. The zeroth law justifies the use of suitable thermodynamic systems as thermometers to provide such a labeling, which yield any number of possible empirical temperature scales, and justifies the use of the second law of thermodynamics to provide an absolute, or thermodynamic temperature scale. Such temperature scales bring additional continuity and ordering (i.e., "hot" and "cold") properties to the concept of temperature.

In the space of thermodynamic parameters, zones of constant temperature form a surface, that provides a natural order of nearby surfaces. One may therefore construct a global temperature function that provides a continuous ordering of states. The dimensionality of a surface of constant temperature is one less than the number of thermodynamic parameters, thus, for an ideal gas described with three thermodynamic parameters P, V and N, it is a two-dimensional surface.

For example, if two systems of ideal gases are in joint thermodynamic equilibrium across an immovable diathermal wall, then P_{1}V_{1}/N_{1} = P_{2}V_{2}/N_{2} where P_{i} is the pressure in the ith system, V_{i} is the volume, and N_{i} is the amount (in moles, or simply the number of atoms) of gas.

The surface PV/N = constant defines surfaces of equal thermodynamic temperature, and one may label defining T so that PV/N = RT, where R is some constant. These systems can now be used as a thermometer to calibrate other systems. Such systems are known as "ideal gas thermometers".

In a sense, focused on the zeroth law, there is only one kind of diathermal wall or one kind of heat, as expressed by Maxwell's dictum that "All heat is of the same kind". But in another sense, heat is transferred in different ranks, as expressed by Arnold Sommerfeld's dictum "Thermodynamics investigates the conditions that govern the transformation of heat into work. It teaches us to recognize temperature as the measure of the work-value of heat. Heat of higher temperature is richer, is capable of doing more work. Work may be regarded as heat of an infinitely high temperature, as unconditionally available heat." This is why temperature is the particular variable indicated by the zeroth law's statement of equivalence.

== Dependence on the existence of walls permeable only to heat ==
In Constantin Carathéodory's (1909) theory, it is postulated that there exist walls "permeable only to heat", though heat is not explicitly defined in that paper. This postulate is a physical postulate of existence. It does not say that there is only one kind of heat. This paper of Carathéodory states as proviso 4 of its account of such walls: "Whenever each of the systems S_{1} and S_{2} is made to reach equilibrium with a third system S_{3} under identical conditions, systems S_{1} and S_{2} are in mutual equilibrium".

It is the function of this statement in the paper, not there labeled as the zeroth law, to provide not only for the existence of transfer of energy other than by work or transfer of matter, but further to provide that such transfer is unique in the sense that there is only one kind of such wall, and one kind of such transfer. This is signaled in the postulate of this paper of Carathéodory that precisely one non-deformation variable is needed to complete the specification of a thermodynamic state, beyond the necessary deformation variables, which are not restricted in number. It is therefore not exactly clear what Carathéodory means when in the introduction of this paper he writes

It is possible to develop the whole theory without assuming the existence of heat, that is of a quantity that is of a different nature from the normal mechanical quantities.

It is the opinion of Elliott H. Lieb and Jakob Yngvason (1999) that the derivation from statistical mechanics of the law of entropy increase is a goal that has so far eluded the deepest thinkers. Thus the idea remains open to consideration that the existence of heat and temperature are needed as coherent primitive concepts for thermodynamics, as expressed, for example, by Maxwell and Max Planck. On the other hand, Planck (1926) clarified how the second law can be stated without reference to heat or temperature, by referring to the irreversible and universal nature of friction in natural thermodynamic processes.

== History ==
Writing long before the term "zeroth law" was coined, in 1871 Maxwell discussed at some length ideas which he summarized by the words "All heat is of the same kind". Modern theorists sometimes express this idea by postulating the existence of a unique one-dimensional hotness manifold, into which every proper temperature scale has a monotonic mapping. This may be expressed by the statement that there is only one kind of temperature, regardless of the variety of scales in which it is expressed. Another modern expression of this idea is that "All diathermal walls are equivalent". This might also be expressed by saying that there is precisely one kind of non-mechanical, non-matter-transferring contact equilibrium between thermodynamic systems.

According to Sommerfeld, Ralph H. Fowler coined the term zeroth law of thermodynamics while discussing the 1935 text by Meghnad Saha and B.N. Srivastava.

They write on page 1 that "every physical quantity must be measurable in numerical terms". They presume that temperature is a physical quantity and then deduce the statement "If a body A is in temperature equilibrium with two bodies B and C, then B and C themselves are in temperature equilibrium with each other". Then they italicize a self-standing paragraph, as if to state their basic postulate:

Any of the physical properties of A which change with the application of heat may be observed and utilised for the measurement of temperature.

They do not themselves use the phrase "zeroth law of thermodynamics" here. There are many statements of these same physical ideas in the physics literature long before this text, in very similar language. What was new here was just the label zeroth law of thermodynamics.

Fowler & Guggenheim (1936/1965) wrote of the zeroth law as follows:

... we introduce the postulate: If two assemblies are each in thermal equilibrium with a third assembly, they are in thermal equilibrium with each other.

They then proposed that

... it may be shown to follow that the condition for thermal equilibrium between several assemblies is the equality of a certain single-valued function of the thermodynamic states of the assemblies, which may be called the temperature t, any one of the assemblies being used as a "thermometer" reading the temperature t on a suitable scale. This postulate of the "Existence of temperature" could with advantage be known as the zeroth law of thermodynamics.

The first sentence of this present article is a version of this statement. It is not explicitly evident in the existence statement of Fowler and Edward A. Guggenheim that temperature refers to a unique attribute of a state of a system, such as is expressed in the idea of the hotness manifold. Also their statement refers explicitly to statistical mechanical assemblies, not explicitly to macroscopic thermodynamically defined systems.
