= Timeline of special relativity and the speed of light =

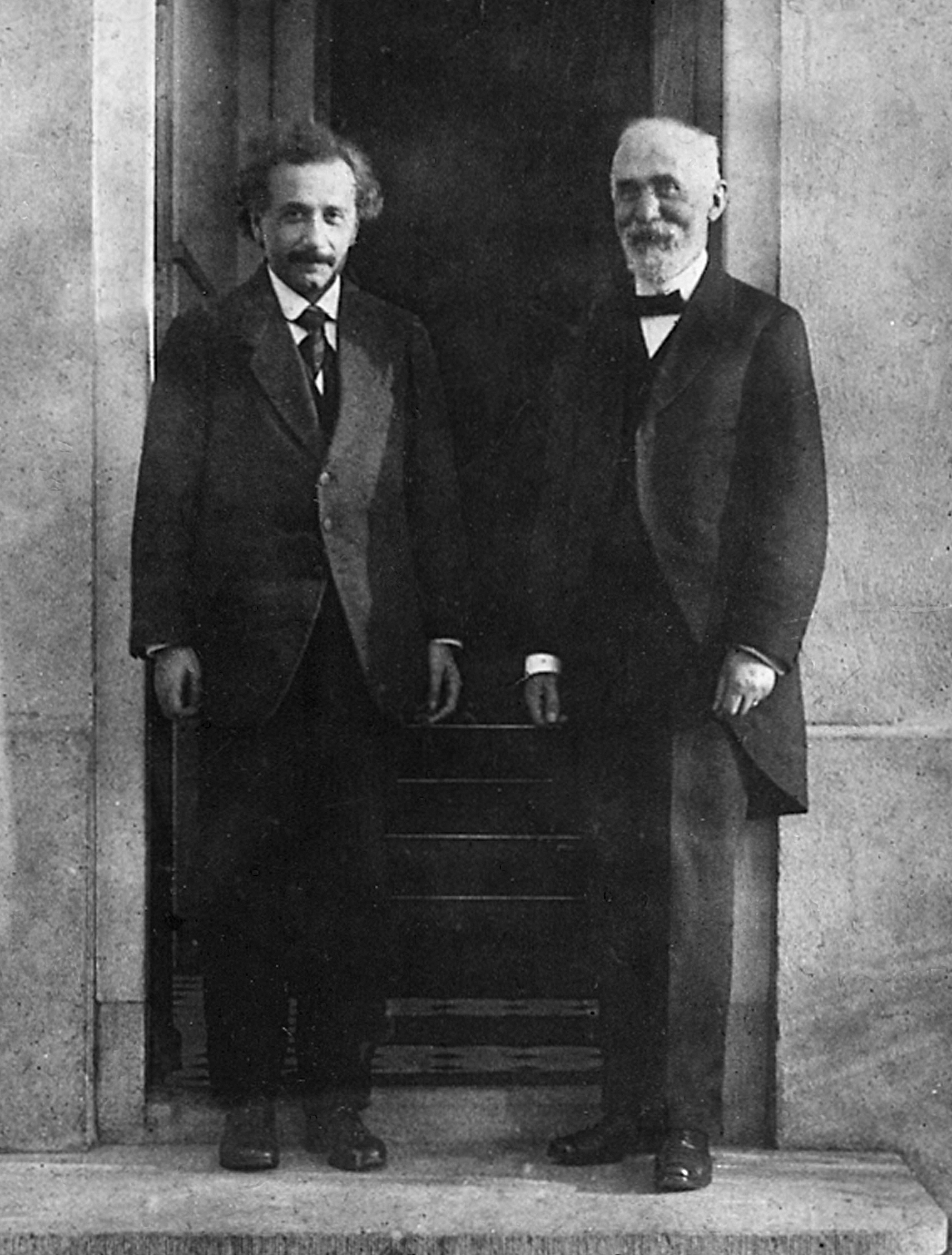
Albert Einstein and Hendrik Lorentz in 1921 in Leiden

This timeline describes the major developments, both experimental and theoretical, of:

- Einstein’s special theory of relativity (SR),
- its predecessors like the theories of luminiferous aether,
- its early competitors, i.e.:
  - Ritz’s ballistic theory of light,
  - the models of electromagnetic mass created by Abraham (1902), Lorentz (1904), Bucherer (1904) and Langevin (1904).

This list also mentions the origins of standard notation (like c) and terminology (like theory of relavity).

== Criteria for inclusion ==
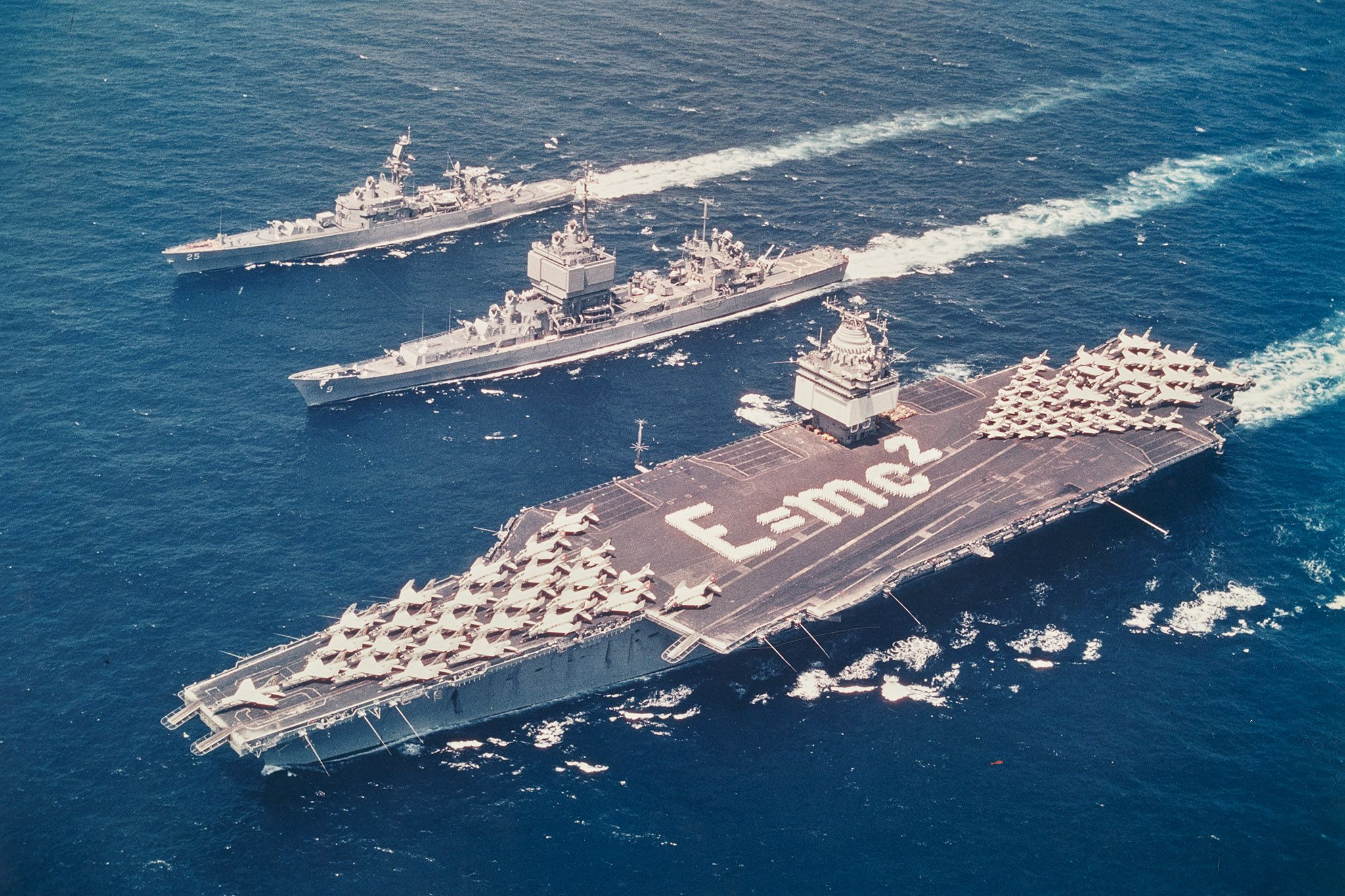
Task Force One, the world's first nuclear-powered task force. Enterprise, Long Beach and Bainbridge in formation in the Mediterranean, 18 June 1964. Enterprise crew members are spelling out Einstein's mass–energy equivalence formula E = mc^{2} on the flight deck.

Theories other than SR are not described here exhaustively, but only to the extent that is directly relevant to SR – i.e. at points when they:

- anticipated some elements of SR, like Fresnel’s hypothesis of partial aether drag,
- led to new experiments testing SR, like Stokes’s model of complete aether drag,
- were disproved or questioned, e.g. by the experiments of Oliver Lodge.

For a more detailed timeline of aether theories – e.g. their emergence with the wave theory of light – see a separate article. Also, not all experiments are listed here – repetitions, even with much higher precision than the original, are mentioned only if they influence or challenge the opinions at their time. It was the case with:

- Michelson and Morley (1886) repeating the experiment of Fizeau (1851), contradicting Michelson’s interpretation of his 1881 experiment;
- Michelson–Morley (1887), more conclusive than the original experiment by Michelson (1881) and difficult to reconcile with their experiment of 1886, or other first-order measurements;
- Kaufmann’s 1906 repetition of his 1902 experiment, because he claimed to contradict the model of Einstein and Lorentz, considered consistent with the data from 1902;
- Miller (1933) or Marinov (1974), with results different than Michelson–Morley.

For lists of repetitions, see the articles of particular experiments. The measurements of speed of light are also mentioned only to the minimum extent, i.e. when they proved for the first time that c is finite and invariant. Innovations like the use of Foucault's rotating mirror or the Fizeau wheel are not listed here – see the article about speed of light.

This timeline also ignores, for reasons of volume and clarity:

- the long story of spacetime and the concept of time as the fourth dimension; e.g. the ideas of Lagrange and Wells;
- mathematical innovations that influenced the formalism of SR, e.g. the introduction of fibre bundles;
- indirect evidence for SR, through the evidence for relativistic theories like general relativity or relativistic quantum mechanics;
- publication of countless textbooks and popular science books or articles, even very influential classics like Mr Tompkins by George Gamow;
- the cultural impact of SR, e.g. publication of documentaries or commemorations of SR during the World Year of Physics 2005;
- new, untested theories modifying SR like Doubly special relativity or Variable speed of light.

== Before the 19th century ==
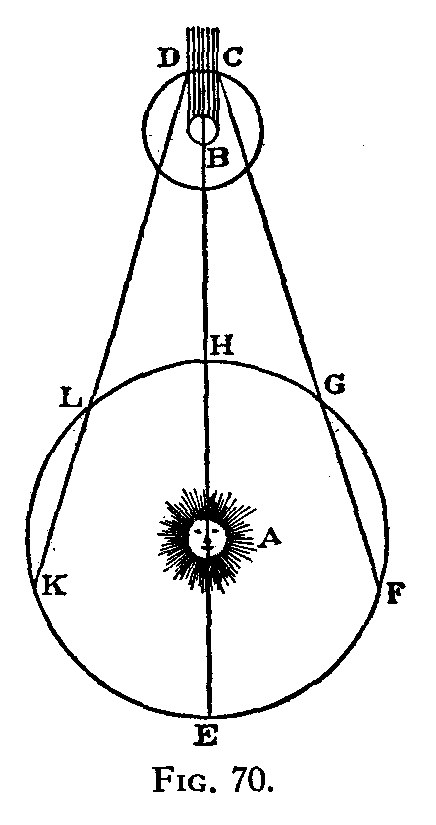
A redrawn version of the illustration from the 1676 news report. Rømer compared the apparent duration of Io's orbits as Earth moved towards Jupiter (F to G) and as Earth moved away from Jupiter (L to K).

- 1632 – Galileo Galilei writes about the relativity of motion and that some forms of motion are undetectable; this would be later called the relativity principle, essential for special relativity as one of its postulates.
- 1674 – Robert Hooke makes his observations of the Gamma Draconis star, or γ Draconis for short. He proves a variation in its position on the sky, which would be later identified as stellar aberration.
- 1676 – Ole Rømer gives the first piece of evidence that the speed of light is finite, through his observation of the moons of Jupiter; the discovery divides scientists of his time.
- 1690 – Christiaan Huygens gives the first estimate of the speed of light in air or vacuum, based on Rømer’s work. The result is equivalent to about 2×10^{8} m/s in modern units, correct only to the order of magnitude.
- 1727 – James Bradley correctly identifies the peculiar behaviour of γ Draconis as stellar aberration. Bradley uses this fact to estimate the speed of light in air or vacuum, and his result is more accurate than Huygens’s: about 3.0×10^{8} m/s in modern units. For the first time, the measurement is correct to the first two significant figures.

== 19th century ==
=== Before 1880s ===
- 1810 – François Arago observes that the speed of light of stars – measured with stellar aberration – may be independent of the relative motion of stars and the Earth; or at least, no differences are observable with a naked eye.
- 1818 – Augustin-Jean Fresnel proposes his model of partial aether dragging to explain Arago’s finding.
- 1845 – George Gabriel Stokes creates his own model of complete aether dragging.
- 1851 – The Fizeau experiment with light in flowing water confirms Fresnel’s model.
- 1861 – James Clerk Maxwell publishes his equations of the electromagnetic field, which had a great impact on the later works on aether and special relativity.
- 1868 – Martinus Hoek modifies the experiment of Fizeau, with the same conclusions.
- 1871 – George Biddell Airy observes the stellar aberration in a telescope filled with water, confirming Fresnel’s model and contradicting Stokes’s.

=== 1880s ===
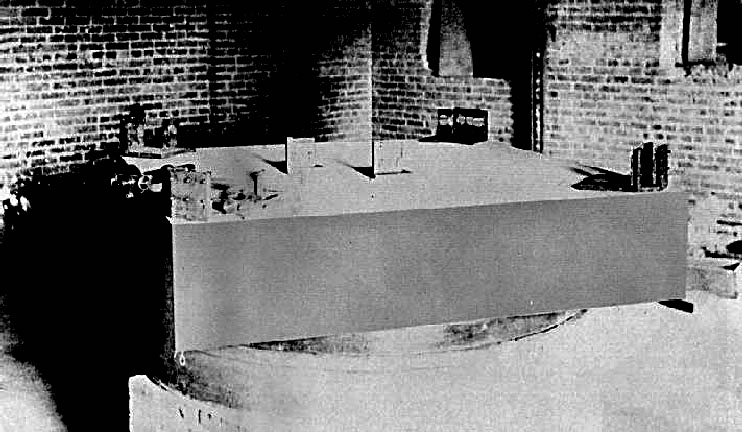
Michelson and Morley's interferometric setup, mounted on a stone slab that floats in an annular trough of mercury

- 1881 – Albert Michelson performs his original interferometric experiment. It detects no aether wind, contradicting Fresnel’s model in favour of Stokes’s.
- 1885 – Ludwig Lange introduces the idea of inertial frame of reference. It is essential to relativity as an element of the modern formulation of the relativity principle.
- 1886 – Albert Michelson and Edward Morley repeat the Fizeau experiment with higher precision, confirming its result and contradicting the earlier conclusions of Michelson.
- 1887 – Woldemar Voigt publishes his coordinate transformations preserving the wave equation. They are very similar – but not equivalent – to the later Lorentz transformations.
- 1887 – the Michelson–Morley experiment fails to detect aether wind, disproving some aether theories and leading to new ones.
- 1889 – George FitzGerald conjectures the length contraction to explain the Michelson–Morley experiment.

=== 1890s ===
- 1892 – Hendrik Lorentz – independently of FitzGerald – proposes the same explanation, with a formula only approximating the special-relativistic length contraction to the first order.
- 1893 – Oliver Lodge makes an interferometric experiment questioning the aether drag hypothesis.
- 1894 – Paul Drude introduces the symbol c for speed of light in vacuum.
- 1895 – Hendrik Lorentz corrects his 1892 model, proposing a contraction by the Lorentz factor (γ).
- 1895 – Albert Einstein probably makes his thought experiment about chasing a light beam, later relevant to his work on special relativity.
- 1897 – Oliver Lodge publishes another experimental result questioning aether drag.
- 1897 – Joseph Larmor publishes his coordinate transformations extending the length contraction formula. These transformations imply a form of time dilation and were an approximation of the full Lorentz transformations.
- 1898 – Henri Poincaré states that simultaneity is relative.
- 1899 – Hendrik Antoon Lorentz publishes an early version of his coordinate transformations, including the local time.

== 20th century ==
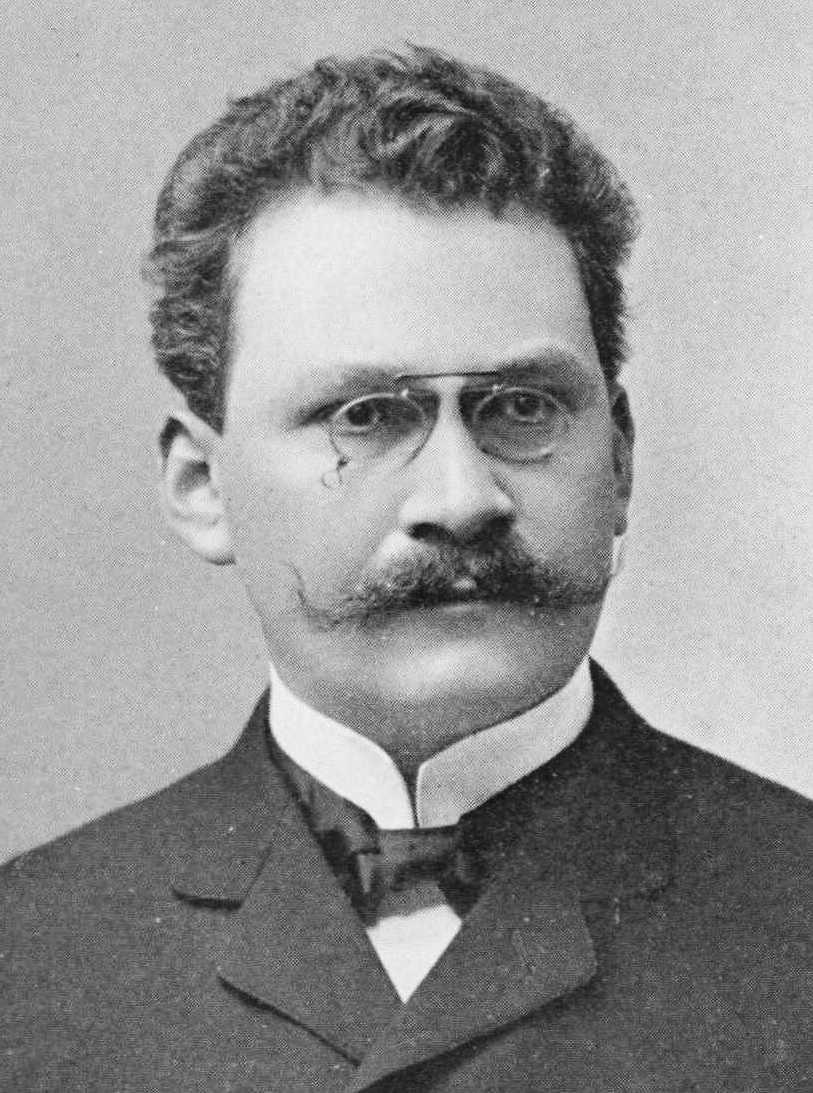
Hermann Minkowski, who introduced the spacetime formalism to special relativity in 1908.

=== 1900s ===
- 1902 – Lord Rayleigh writes that Lorentz’s hypothesis of length contraction predicts a form of birefringence and tries to observe it. The null result questions Lorentz’s model, but it would be later explained by a combination of length contraction and time dilation.
- 1902 – Max Abraham develops his classical model of the electron. It anticipated some elements of special relativity like the non-linear dependence of momentum on velocity – or, in other, more debatable terms, the relativistic mass. However, Abraham’s formula was different than in SR or in Lorentz’s theory.
- 1902 – Walter Kaufmann publishes his measurements of how the electron’s momentum – or, using later terms, its relativistic mass – depends on its speed. The results seem to confirm Abraham’s model.
- 1903 – Olinto De Pretto presents his aether theory with some form of mass–energy equivalence. It was described by a formula looking like Einstein’s E = mc^{2}, but with different meanings of the terms.
- 1903 – Frederick Thomas Trouton and H.R. Noble publish the results of their experiment with capacitors, showing no aether drift.
- 1904 – DeWitt Bristol Brace conducts an improved version of Rayleigh’s 1902 experiment, again with null result.
- 1904 – Hendrik Lorentz explains the experimental results of Rayleigh, Brace, Trouton and Noble, using his refined coordinate transformations; he also proves that Maxwell’s equations are invariant under them. Lorentz also presents his own classical model of the electron, including the length contraction absent in the work of Abraham – but consistent with Kaufmann’s data so far.
- 1904 – Alfred Bucherer and Paul Langevin independently publish a model of the electron and its mass increasing with speed, in a way different both from Abraham’s and Lorentz’s theories. This hypothesis was also consistent with Kaufmann’s results at that stage.
- 1904 – Henri Poincaré presents the principle of relativity for electromagnetism.
- 1905 – Poincaré introduces the name Lorentz transformations and is the first to present them in their full form that would be later present in Einstein’s special relativity proper. Also, Poincaré is the first to describe the relativistic velocity-addition formula – implicitly in his publication and explicitly in his letter to Lorentz.
- 1905 – Albert Einstein publishes his special theory of relativity, including the mass–energy equivalence that would be later written as E = mc^{2}.
- 1906 – Alfred Bucherer introduces the name theory of relativity, based on Max Planck’s term relative theory.
- 1906 – Walter Kaufmann publishes his new measurements of the mass–velocity dependence, and claims to disprove the formula of Lorentz and Einstein. At the same time, he accepts that both the old model of Abraham (1902) and the later model of Bucherer & Langevin (1904) are consistent with the data.
- 1907 – Max Von Laue describes how the relativistic velocity-addition formula recreates the Fresnel drag coefficients.
- 1908 – Hermann Minkowski publishes his spacetime formalism of special relativity.
- 1908 – Frederick Thomas Trouton and Alexander Rankine conduct an experiment with electric circuit, proving that the length contraction is not the only relativistic effect and some form of time dilation is present – similarly to the previous experiments by Rayleigh (1902) and Brace (1904).
- 1908 – Walther Ritz publishes his ballistic theory of light as an alternative to special relativity and Maxwell’s electrodynamics.
- 1909 – Paul Ehrenfest publishes the Ehrenfest paradox about rigidity in special relativity.
- 1909 – Gilbert N. Lewis and Richard Tolman coin the disputed term relativistic mass.

=== 1910s ===
Schematic representation of a Sagnac interferometer.

- 1910 – Vladimir Ignatowski makes the first derivations of Lorentz transformations that rely mostly – and almost entirely – on the relativity principle, without appealing to Maxwell’s equations; such derivations are sometimes called single-postulate.
- 1910 – Edmund Taylor Whittaker and Vladimir Varićak introduce the idea of rapidity, but without using this name.
- 1911 – Alfred Robb coins the term rapidity.
- 1911 – Paul Langevin presents the twin paradox implied by time dilation.
- 1911 – Max von Laue writes that special relativity and Lorentz aether theory predict the Sagnac effect, absent in Ritz's ballistic theory or in Stokes's theory of aether drag.
- 1913 – Georges Sagnac observes the effect named after him, disproving Ritz's ballistic theory or aether drag. However, he favours Lorentz's model and even claims – incorrectly – to contradict SR.
- 1913 – Willem de Sitter describes how the light of double stars contradicts Ritz’s ballistic theory of light.
- 1914 – Ludwik Silberstein gives the first description of Thomas–Wigner rotation, then underappreciated.
- 1914 – Günther Neumann measures the mass–velocity dependence for electrons. His result favours the formula of Lorentz & Einstein over the one by Abraham.
- 1915 – Charles-Eugène Guye and Charles Lavanchy make their own measurements of the inertia of cathode rays, much more exact than the earlier research by Kaufmann. Their conclusion is opposite to Kaufmann’s – again, the formula of Lorentz and Einstein is correct and Abraham’s model is disproved.

=== 1920s and 1930s ===
- 1924 – Hans Thirring notices that ballistic theories of light contradict spectroscopic observations of the Sun.
- 1924 – Anton Lampa predicts a relativistic effect later known as Penrose–Terrell rotation.
- 1925 – the Michelson–Gale–Pearson experiment tests the Sagnac effect caused by the Earth’s rotation. The result disproves any aether drag; in combination with other experiments – disproving the stationary aether like the Michelson–Morley experiment – it proves the Lorentz transformations correct.
- 1925 – Llewelyn Thomas discovers Thomas precession, which can be explained by the effect described earlier by Silberstein and later by Wigner.
- 1928 – Paul Dirac describes the general energy–momentum relation, extending the equivalence of mass and energy.
- 1932 – Kennedy–Thorndike experiment confirms the Lorentz transformations in a new way, complementary to the Michelson–Morley experiment. These two results, if combined, prove some form of time dilation.
- 1932 – John Cockcroft and Ernest Walton prove the mass–energy equivalence via a nuclear reaction.
- 1933 – Dayton Miller conducts an improved form of the Michelson–Morley experiment, claiming to contradict special relativity. It would be later explained consistently with SR in the 1950s.
- 1935 – the Hammar experiment is another refutation of aether drag and evidence for special relativity.
- 1938 – Ives–Stilwell experiment measures time dilation via the relativistic Doppler effect. For the first time, the Lorentz transformations can be derived directly from empirical data, as would be noticed by Robertson in 1949.
- 1939 – Eugene Wigner rediscovers that SR predicts the Thomas–Wigner rotation.

=== After 1930s ===
- 1940 – Bruno Rossi and D.B. Hall observe time dilation in cosmic rays, i.e. in the decay of muons.
- 1949 – Howard P. Robertson notices that the Lorentz transformations can be deduced (extracted) from three key experiments: Michelson–Morley, Kennedy–Thorndike and Ives–Stillwell.
- 1954 – Gerhart Lüders and Wolfgang Pauli prove that the Lorentz invariance in quantum field theories implies the CPT symmetry, allowing for new tests of special relativity.
- 1955 – Robert S. Shankland and others explain Miller’s experimental result from 1933 in a way consistent with special relativity.
- 1959 – Roger Penrose and James Terrell independently publish their rediscovery that SR predicts the Penrose–Terrell effect.
- 1959 – E. Dewan and M. Beran publish the thought experiment known as Bell's spaceship paradox.
- 1960 – Vernon W. Hughes et al. perform a spectroscopic experiment, later interpreted as evidence for the Lorentz invariance of particle interactions.
- 1961 – Ronald Drever independently conducts a similar experiment with the same conclusions.
- 1961 – Wolfgang Rindler presents and solves the ladder paradox.
- 1967 – Gerald Feinberg introduces the term tachyon for hypothetical particles with speeds higher than that of light in vacuum (c).
- 1971 – The Hafele–Keating experiment confirms time dilation predicted by special & general relativity.
- 1974 – Stefan Marinov claims to contradict special relativity by measuring a variation in c. His results are noted by the scientific community but rejected as incorrect.
- 1983 – the speed of light in vacuum (c) is used to define the metre in the SI system of units; the definition does not mention any frame of reference, assuming this speed is universal, and implicitly that special relativity is correct.

== 21st century ==
- 2011 – Faster-than-light neutrino anomaly is reported by CERN.
- 2012 – the anomaly in neutrino speed is explained by a failure of the equipment; this reason is officially reported.

== See also ==
- History of Lorentz transformations
- Timeline of gravitational physics and relativity
