= Timeline of luminiferous aether =

The timeline of luminiferous aether (light-bearing aether) or ether as a medium for propagating electromagnetic radiation begins in the 18th century. The aether was assumed to exist for much of the 19th century—until the Michelson–Morley experiment returned its famous null result. Further experiments were in general agreement with Michelson and Morley's result. By the 1920s, most scientists rejected the aether's existence.

== Timeline ==
=== Antiquity ===
4th-century BC – Aristotle publishes Physics, in which the aether is briefly described as being an element lighter than air that surrounds celestial bodies. He describes the aether in relation to other elements – aether is lighter than air and is located above it, whereas air is lighter than water, and water is lighter than earth. In Aristotle's view, each element returns to its proper place when displaced, which explains why air rises, why earth and water fall, and why the heavens remain in place.

=== Early experiments ===
17th century: Robert Boyle was a proponent of an aether hypothesis. According to Boyle, the aether consists of subtle particles, one sort of which explains the absence of vacuum and the mechanical interactions between bodies, and the other sort of which explains phenomena such as magnetism (and possibly gravity) that are, otherwise, inexplicable on the basis of purely mechanical interactions of macroscopic bodies.
1690 – Christiaan Huygens's Treatise on Light hypothesized that light is a wave propagating through an aether.
1704 – Isaac Newton publishes Opticks, in which he proposes a particle theory of light. This had trouble explaining diffraction, so he adds a "fudge factor," claiming that an "Aethereal Medium" is responsible for this effect, and going further to suggest it might be responsible for other physical effects such as heat.
1727 – James Bradley measures stellar aberration for the first time, proving (again) that light has a finite speed as well as that the Earth is moving.
1818 – Augustin-Jean Fresnel introduces the wave theory of light, which proposes light is a transverse wave travelling in an aether, thereby explaining how polarization can exist. Both Newton's particle theory and Fresnel's wave theory both assume an aether exists, albeit for different reasons. From this point on, no one even seems to question its existence.
1820 – Discovery of Siméon Poisson's "Bright Spot", supporting the Wave Theory.
1830 – Fresnel develops a formula for predicting and measuring aether dragging by massive objects, based on a coupling constant. Such dragging seems to be at odds with aberration however, which would require the Earth not to drag the aether in order to be visible.

George Gabriel Stokes becomes a champion of the dragging theory.

1851 – Hippolyte Fizeau carries out his famous experiment with light travelling through moving water. He measures fringing due to motion of the water, perfectly in line with Fresnel's formula. However he sees no effect due to the motion of the Earth, although he does not comment on this. Nevertheless this is seen as very strong evidence for aether dragging.
1868 – Martin Hoek carries out an improved version of Fizeau's using an interferometer experiment with one arm in water. He sees no effect at all, and cannot offer an explanation as to why his experiment is so at odds with Fizeau's.
1871 – George Biddell Airy re-runs Bradley's experiment with a telescope filled with water. He too sees no effect. It appears that aether is not dragged by mass.
1873 – James Clerk Maxwell publishes his Treatise on Electricity and Magnetism.
1879 – Maxwell suggests absolute velocity of Earth in aether may be optically detectable.
1881 – Albert A. Michelson publishes his first interferometer experiments, using the device for the measurement of extremely small distances. To Michelson's dismay, his experiment finds no "ether drag" slowing light, as had been suggested by Fresnel.

Hendrik Antoon Lorentz finds Michelson's calculation have errors (i.e., doubling of the expected fringe shift error).

1882 – Michelson acknowledges his interpretation errors.

=== Crisis ===
1887 – the Michelson–Morley experiment (MMX) produces the famous null result. A small drift is seen, but it is too small to support any "fixed" aether theory, and is so small that it might be due to experimental error.

Many physicists dust off Stokes' work, and dragging becomes the "standard solution"

1887 to 1888 – Heinrich Hertz verifies the existence of electromagnetic waves.
1889 – George FitzGerald proposes the Contraction Hypothesis, which suggests that the measurements are null due to changes in the length in the direction of travel through the aether.
1892 – Oliver Lodge demonstrates that aether drag is invisible around rapidly moving celestial bodies.
1895 – Lorentz proposes independently the Contraction Hypothesis.
1902 to 1904 – Morley and Morley conduct a number of MM experiments with a 100 ft interferometer, producing the null result.
1902 to 1904 – Lord Rayleigh and DeWitt Bristol Brace found no signs of double refraction (due to FitzGerald–Lorentz Contraction) of moving bodies in the aether.
1903 – the Trouton–Noble experiment, based on an entirely different concept using electrical forces, also produces the null result
1905 – Miller and Morley's experiment data is published. Test of the Contraction Hypothesis has negative results. Test for aether dragging effects produces null result.
1908 – the Trouton–Rankine experiment, another experiment based on electrical effects, does not detect the FitzGerald–Lorentz Contraction.

=== Change ===
1904 – Hendrik Lorentz publishes a new theory of moving bodies, without discarding the stationary (electromagnetic) ether concept.
1905 – Henri Poincaré shows that Lorentz's theory fulfills the principle of relativity, and publishes the Lorentz transformations. His model was still based on Lorentz's ether, but he argues that this aether is perfectly undetectable.
1905 – Albert Einstein publishes an observationally equivalent theory, but complete with a derivation from principles alone (leaving the ether aside). Einstein also emphasized that this concept implies the relativity of space and time. He later labelled it special relativity.
1908 – Trouton–Rankine experiment shows that length contraction of an object according to one frame does not produce a measurable change of resistance in the object's rest frame
1913 – Georges Sagnac uses a rotating MMX device and receives a clearly positive result. The so-called Sagnac effect was considered excellent evidence for aether at the time, but was later explained via general relativity. Good explanations based on SR also exist.
1914 – Walther Zurhellen uses observations of binary stars to determine if the speed of light is dependent on movement of the source. His measurements show that it is not to 10^{−6}. This is claimed to be additional evidence against aether dragging.
1915 – Einstein publishes on the general theory of relativity.
1919 – Arthur Eddington's Africa eclipse expedition is conducted and appears to confirm the general theory of relativity.
1920 – Einstein says that special relativity does not require rejecting the aether, and that the gravitational field of general relativity may be called aether, to which no state of motion can be attributed.
1921 – Dayton Miller conducts aether drift experiments at Mount Wilson. Miller performs tests with insulated and non-magnetic interferometers and obtains positive results.
1921 to 1924 – Miller conducts extensive tests under controlled conditions at Case University.
1924 – Miller repeats his experiments at Mount Wilson and yields a positive result.

Rudolf Tomaschek uses stars for his interferometer light source, getting the null result.

1925 – the Michelson–Gale–Pearson experiment produces a positive result while attempting to detect the effect of Earth's rotation on the velocity of light. The significance of the experiment remains debated to this day, but this planetary Sagnac effect is measured by ring laser gyros and taken into account by the GPS system.
1925 April – Meeting of the National Academy of Sciences.

Arthur Compton explains the problems with the Stokes aether drag solution.
Miller presents his positive results of the aether drag.

1925 December – American Association for the Advancement of Science meeting.

Miller proposes two theories to account for the positive result. One consists of a modified aether theory, the other a slight departure from the Contraction Hypothesis.

1926 – Roy J. Kennedy produces a null result on Mount Wilson

Auguste Piccard and Ernest Stahel produce a null result on Mont Rigi.

1927 – Mount Wilson conference.

Miller talks of partial entrainment
Michelson talks about aether drag and altitude differential effects
K. K. Illingworth produces a null result using a clever version of the MMX with a step in one mirror that dramatically improves resolution. The resolution is so good that most partial entrainment systems can be eliminated.

1929 – Michelson and F. G. Pease perform the Pearson experiment and produce a null result.
1930 – Georg Joos produces a null result using an extremely accurate interferometer placed entirely in vacuum.
1932 – the Kennedy–Thorndike experiment uses an interferometer with arms of different lengths and not at right angles. They measure over several seasons and record on photographs to allow better post-measurement study. The Kennedy Thorndike experiment becomes one of the fundamental tests for SR, proving the independence of light speed wrt to the speed of the emitting source. The other two fundamental tests are Michelson–Morley experiment (proves light speed isotropy) and Ives–Stilwell experiment (proves time dilation)
1934 – Georg Joos publishes on the Michelson–Gale–Pearson experiment, stating that it is improbable that aether would be entrained by translational motion and not by rotational motion.
1935 – Hammar experiment disproves aether entrainment
1951 – Paul Dirac writes that currently-accepted quantum field theory requires an aether, although he never formulated this theory completely.

=== Debate slows ===
1955 – R. S. Shankland, S. W. McCuskey, F. C. Leone, and G. Kuerti performed an analysis of Miller's results and explained them as stemming from systematic errors (Shankland's explanation is now widely accepted).
1958 – Cedarholm, Havens, and Townes use two masers frequency locked to each other and send the light in two directions. They receive the null result. The experiment is not as precise as earlier light-based MMX experiments, but demonstrates a novel setup that would become much more accurate in the future.
1964 – Jaseja, Javan, Murray and Townes repeat the earlier experiment with newer and much more precise masers.
1969 – Shamir and Fox repeat the MMX experiment with the "arms" in acrylic glass waveguides and a highly stable laser as the source. The experiment should detect a shift as small as ~0.00003 of a fringe, and none is measured.
1972 – R. S. Shankland admits he would not likely have given the effort to question Dayton Miller's work had it not been for Albert Einstein's "interest and encouragement."
1973 – Trimmer finds a null result in a triangular interferometer with one leg in glass.
1977 – Brecher repeats Zurhellen's experiment with binary pulsars, showing no difference in light speed to 2*10^{−9}
1979 Brillet and Hall use the Townes setup with highly accurate lasers, demonstrating no drift to 3 parts in 10^{15}. The experiment also demonstrates a leftover 17 Hz signal, but the authors assume it is linked to the laboratory.
1984 – Torr and Kolen find a cyclic phase shift between two atomic clocks, but the distance between is relatively short (0.5 km) and they are clocks of the less-precise rubidium type
1988 – Gagnon et al. measure one way light speed and detect no anisotropy
1990 – Hils and Hall repeat the Kennedy–Thorndike experiment with lasers, taking measurements over the period of a year. They find no shifting in 2 10^{−13}

Krisher et al., Phys. Rev. D, 42, No. 2, pp. 731–734, (1990) use two hydrogen masers fixed to the earth and separated by a 21 km fiber-optic link to look for variations in the phase between them. They put an upper limit on the one-way linear anisotropy of 100 m/s.
1991 – Over a six-month period, Roland DeWitte finds, over a 1.5 km underground coaxial cable, a cyclic component in the phase drift between higher-precision caesium-beam clocks on more-or-less the same meridian; the period equals the sidereal day
2003 – Holger Mueller and Achim Peters carry out a Modern Michelson–Morley Experiment using Cryogenic Optical Resonators at Humboldt University, Berlin. They find no shifting in 10^{−15}

== Classical references ==
- Maxwell, Collected Papers, H. A. Lorentz, Archives Neerlandaises, xxi. 1887, and xxv. 1892
- Versuch einer Theorie der electrischen und optischen Erscheinungen in bewegten Korpern (Leyden, 1895)
- "Elektrodynamik " and " Elektronentheorie " in the Encyk. der Math. Wissenschaften, Band v. 13, 14
- O. Lodge, " On Aberration Problems," Phil. Trans. 1893 and 1897
- J. Larmor, Phil. Trans. 1894-95-97, and a treatise, Aether and Matter (1900) p. 262
- P. K. L. Drude, A. Schuster, R. W., General physics of the aether;
- Collected Papers of Lord Rayleigh

== See also ==
- Timeline of special relativity and the speed of light
- Electricity
- Electricity (History of discovery)
- Electromagnetism
- History of electromagnetic theory
- Light
- Light (Wave theory)
- Luminiferous aether
- Luminiferous aether (The history of light and aether)
- Magnetism
- Magnetic field

== External links and references ==
- Chisholm, Hugh, ed. (1911). "Aether" . Encyclopædia Britannica. Vol. 1 (11th ed.). Cambridge University Press. pp. 292–297.
- James DeMeo: "Dayton Miller's Ether-Drift Experiments: A Fresh Look"
