= James Terrell =

James Terrell may refer to:

- James C. Terrell (1806–1835), American politician
- James Render Terrell Sr., lawyer, solicitor general, and state legislator in Georgia
- Jim Terrell (born 1965), American sprint canoer
- James Terrell (physicist), name given to Terrell rotation

== See also ==
- Terrell James (born 1955), artist
- James Turrell (born 1943), American artist
