= Harzer (disambiguation) =

Harzer is a variety of cheese.

Harzer may also refer to:

== Harz mountains ==
- Harzer Wandernadel, a system of hiking awards
- Harzer Hexenstieg, a footpath

== People ==
- Jens Harzer (born 1972), German actor
- Paul Harzer (1857–1932), German mathematician and astronomer
- Ulrike Harzer (born 1968), German politician
- Walter Harzer (1912–1982), military officer
