= Aether theories =

Set of theories

In the history of physics, aether theories (or ether theories) proposed the existence of a medium, a space-filling substance or field as a transmission medium for the propagation of electromagnetic or gravitational forces. Using a substantial aether fell out of use in modern physics after experiments like the Michelson–Morley experiment of July 1887 which failed to detect an aether. However, aether theories were still popular among other scientific circles until the early 1920s, at which point the theory was largely abandoned. The development of special relativity theories made aether theory unnecessary.

This early modern aether has little in common with the aether of classical elements from which the name was borrowed. The assorted theories embody the various conceptions of this medium and substance.

== Historical models ==
=== Luminiferous aether ===
Isaac Newton suggests the existence of an aether in the Third Book of Opticks (1st ed. 1704; 2nd ed. 1718):

Doth not this aethereal medium in passing out of water, glass, crystal, and other compact and dense bodies in empty spaces, grow denser and denser by degrees, and by that means refract the rays of light not in a point, but by bending them gradually in curve lines? ...Is not this medium much rarer within the dense bodies of the Sun, stars, planets and comets, than in the empty celestial space between them? And in passing from them to great distances, doth it not grow denser and denser perpetually, and thereby cause the gravity of those great bodies towards one another, and of their parts towards the bodies; every body endeavouring to go from the denser parts of the medium towards the rarer?

In the 19th century, luminiferous aether (or ether), meaning light-bearing aether, was a theorized medium for the propagation of light. James Clerk Maxwell developed a model to explain electric and magnetic phenomena using the aether, a model that led to what are now called Maxwell's equations and the understanding that light is an electromagnetic wave. Later, a series of increasingly careful experiments were carried out in the late 1800s, including the Michelson–Morley experiment, to try to detect the motion of Earth through the aether, but no drag was detected. A range of proposed aether-dragging theories could explain the null result but these were more complex, and tended to use arbitrary-looking coefficients and physical assumptions. Joseph Larmor discussed the aether in terms of a moving magnetic field caused by the acceleration of electrons.

Hendrik Lorentz and George Francis FitzGerald offered, within the framework of Lorentz ether theory, an explanation of how the Michelson–Morley experiment could have failed to detect motion through the aether. However, the initial Lorentz theory predicted that motion through the aether would create a birefringence effect, which Rayleigh and Brace tested and failed to find (Experiments of Rayleigh and Brace). All of those results required the full application of the Lorentz transformation by Lorentz and Joseph Larmor in 1904. Summarizing the results of Michelson, Rayleigh and others, Hermann Weyl would later write that the aether had "betaken itself to the land of the shades in a final effort to elude the inquisitive search of the physicist". In addition to possessing more conceptual clarity, Albert Einstein's 1905 special theory of relativity could explain all of the experimental results without referring to an aether at all. This eventually led most physicists to conclude that the earlier notion of a luminiferous aether was not a useful concept.

=== Electric aether ===
Before any connection was made between light and electromagnetism, an electric aether was proposed to explain electrostatic phenomena. Johann Euler, developed a model for electrostatic forces in 1757 based on fluid dynamics in the aether, before the introduction of Coulomb's law. Johann's father, Leonhard Euler hypothesized in 1760 that the luminiferous aether could explain electric phenomena.

=== Mechanical gravitational aether ===
From the 16th until the late 19th century, gravitational effects had also been modeled using an aether. In a note at the end of his work "A Dynamical Theory of the Electromagnetic Field", Maxwell discussed a model for gravity based on a medium similar to the one he used for the electromagnetic field. He concluded that the medium would have "an enormous intrinsic energy" and would necessarily have to be diminished in areas of mass. He could not "understand in what way a medium can possess such properties" so he did not pursue it further. The most well-known formulation is Le Sage's theory of gravitation, although variations on the idea were entertained by Isaac Newton, Bernhard Riemann, and Lord Kelvin. For example, Kelvin published a historical note on Le Sage's model in 1872, noting that Le Sage's proposal disagreed with conservation of energy. Kelvin suggested a possible way to salvage it using the Kelvin's vortex theory of the atom. That theory was extended by JJ Thomson but ultimately abandoned as not productive.

None of those concepts are considered to be viable by the scientific community today.

== Non-standard interpretations in modern physics ==
=== General relativity ===
Albert Einstein sometimes used the word aether for the gravitational field within general relativity, but the only similarity of this relativistic aether concept with the classical aether models lies in the presence of physical properties in space, which can be identified through geodesics. As historians such as John Stachel argue, Einstein's views on the "new aether" are not in conflict with his abandonment of the aether in 1905. As Einstein himself pointed out, no "substance" and no state of motion can be attributed to that new aether. Einstein's use of the word "aether" found little support in the scientific community, and played no role in the continuing development of modern physics.

=== Quantum vacuum ===
Quantum mechanics can be used to describe spacetime as being non-empty at extremely small scales, fluctuating and generating particle pairs that appear and disappear incredibly quickly. It has been suggested by some such as Paul Dirac that this quantum vacuum may be the equivalent in modern physics of a particulate aether. However, Dirac's aether hypothesis was motivated by his dissatisfaction with quantum electrodynamics, and it never gained support from the mainstream scientific community.

Physicist Robert B. Laughlin has suggested that the quantum vacuum could be viewed as a "relativistic ether". Paul Davies writes that while the quantum vacuum resembles in some ways the old concept of the aether, the two differ in a key respect: the quantum vacuum "has no privileged reference frame, no state of rest relative to which a material body could be said to move."

=== Pilot waves ===
Louis de Broglie stated, "Any particle, ever isolated, has to be imagined as in continuous "energetic contact" with a hidden medium." However, as de Broglie pointed out, this medium "could not serve as a universal reference medium, as this would be contrary to relativity theory."

== See also ==
- Absolute space and time
- Frame-dragging
- Tests of general relativity
- Tests of special relativity
