= Alexander Rankine =

British physicist (1881–1956)

- Born: Alexander Oliver Rankine; 8 December 1881
- Died: 20 January 1956 (aged 74)
- Education: University College London
- Known for: Trouton–Rankine experiment
- Awards: OBE; Fellow of the Royal Society; Royal Institution Christmas Lectures (1932); Guthrie Lecturer (1949)
- Scientific career
- Workplaces: Imperial College London

Alexander Oliver Rankine (8 December 1881 – 20 January 1956) was a British physicist who worked on the viscosity of gases, molecular dynamics, optics, acoustics and geophysics.

== Career ==
Rankine carried out government research during both World Wars, working on anti-submarine technology and on fog dispersal systems. He studied and worked at University College London, and was a professor of physics at Imperial College London.

Rankine is most associated with the Trouton–Rankine experiment of 1908, but he also worked on early devices for the optical transmission of sound, and improved gravimeter and magnetometer designs. The latter part of his career was spent working for the Anglo-Iranian Oil Company. He also served in a range of positions with many learned societies, including periods as president of the Physical Society and secretary to the Royal Institution.

== Early years ==
Alexander Oliver Rankine was born on 8 December 1881 in Guildford, Surrey, England. The son of the Reverend John Rankine, a Baptist minister of Scottish descent, Alexander was brought up in and was a member of the Baptist Church. Like his father, his mother was also of Scottish ancestry.

Rankine was educated at the Royal Grammar School, Guildford, and then studied at University College London (UCL), graduating in 1904 with first-class honours in physics. Following graduation, he worked as an assistant in the UCL physics department from 1904, a position he remained in until 1919 apart from a period spent doing wartime research. In 1907, he married Ruby Irene Short, with whom he had two sons and two daughters.

== University College and World War I ==
During this period at UCL, Rankine worked under the Irish physicist Frederick Thomas Trouton. In 1908, he and Trouton carried out what become known as the Trouton–Rankine experiment. This experiment was among a number being carried out at the time, and was intended as a test of aether theory and Einstein's special relativity, with Trouton and Rankine's null result providing support for the latter theory.

Two years later, in 1910, Rankine obtained his D.Sc in Physics (awarded by the University of London). A further two years after that, in 1912, he was elected a fellow of University College. His research in this period was on the viscosity of gases, and he invented a viscosimeter (the Rankine viscosimeter), enabling him to carry out experimental determinations of the Sutherland constant (described by William Sutherland). this work aimed to produce estimates of the size and shape of gas molecules. Rankine's results in this area were published between 1910 and 1926. While at UCL, Rankine also served twice as President of 'The Chemical and Physical Society' (ChemPhysSoc), the students' society of the chemistry and physics departments, doing so in the years 1910–11 and 1915–16.

During World War I, many scientists were seconded to conduct wartime research for the government. Rankine's wartime research took place in 1917 and 1918. He worked under recently appointed UCL professor William Henry Bragg and British-born Canadian physicist Arthur Stewart Eve. Rankine worked first at Aberdour on the Firth of Forth in Scotland, then at the Harwich research station, both as part of work by the Admiralty Research Laboratory. His final posting was as Director of the research station at Kingswear. Rankine's work during this period included developing submarine detection technology.

Rankine's research during and immediately after the war also looked at ways to achieve the optical transmission of sound, a problem being worked on by other scientists and engineers in several countries. The device was similar to the photophone constructed by US inventor Alexander Graham Bell in the 1880s, and the system being developed by the Polish engineer Joseph Tykociński-Tykociner from 1918. Rankine's work in this area was mentioned in Popular Science in 1922, and has been described as an "effective technique for the transmission of speech by sunlight".

For his government research work during World War I, Rankine was made an OBE in 1919.

== Imperial College and geophysics ==
By the time the war had ended, Rankine had added to the distinguished reputation he had gained from work in fields such as molecular dynamics, acoustics and electromagnetics. In 1919, he was appointed Professor of Physics at Imperial College, succeeding to the position held by Lord Rayleigh. It was around this time that Rankine wrote for the Encyclopædia Britannica under the initials AOR (1922 edition), contributing the article on 'Sound'

From 1925 to 1931, Rankine was additionally Director of the Technical Optics Department at Imperial College. He was the second holder of this post, succeeding Frederic John Cheshire, and the department name was changed at his request (it had previously been the Optical Design Department). From 1931 onwards, Rankine was again solely Professor of Physics following the merger of the Technical Optics Department with the Physics Department, with Louis Claude Martin taking over as leader of what was now a postgraduate section (and today is the photonics section).

These changes mirrored Rankine's shift in interests from optics to the newly emerging field of geophysics. His interest in this area developed in the late 1920s and early 1930s, and from 1927 onwards he became an advisor for the Anglo-Persian Oil Company (later the Anglo-Iran Oil Company, and later still British Petroleum). It was in 1934 that the School of Applied Geophysics was established at Imperial College, with Rankine directing the research. His work in this area included improving the gravimeter invented by Loránd Eötvös (the Eötvös gravimeter) and constructing a magnetometer "of great sensitivity".

In 1937, Rankine resigned from Imperial College to take up a full-time position with the Anglo-Iranian Oil Company, in which role he made several visits to Persia (Iran). This resignation was marked by the following rhyme, published in 1937 in The Record of the Royal College of Science Association:

If Rankine prefers travel
To academic toil,
No one of us will cavil,
At the fact that he's struck oil.

On his departure, Rankine became Emeritus Professor of Physics at Imperial College, holding that title from 1937 to his death.

== Learned and professional societies ==
During his career, Rankine was "an active member of several professional societies" and "held various honorary positions throughout his life". In 1925 he was elected a member of the Royal Institution. He was also involved with the British Association for the Advancement of Science (BAAS), serving as the Recorder for Section A (Mathematics and Physics) from 1921 to 1924, and President of Section A in 1932. He was Honorary Secretary of both the Physical Society (1923–29) and the Institute of Physics (1926–31). He also served as president of the Optical Society (1931–32) and the Physical Society (1932–1934), both of these organisations later merging with the Institute of Physics.

One of the final positions he held was secretary to the Royal Institution (1945–1953). It was in this role that he became a key player in the opposition to the Andrade reforms, a power struggle that led to a 1952 vote of no confidence in Edward Andrade as Director of the Royal Institution.

== Awards and honours ==
As well as his OBE, Rankine was accorded other honours for his work. These included being asked to present the 1932 Royal Institution Christmas Lecture, which he gave under the title: 'The Round of the Waters'. In 1934 he was elected a Fellow of the Royal Society. He was also made the Guthrie Lecturer in 1949, delivering the 33rd Guthrie Lecture on 19 March 1949, titled 'Experimental Studies in Thermal Convection'.

== World War II and later years ==
During World War II, Rankine again worked for the government, this time on the development of the FIDO system for clearing fog from military runways. This work was done with the Petroleum Warfare Department, and he contributed to both the design and testing done on the system in wind tunnels at the Empress Hall, Earls Court. The system was then developed further by Arthur Hartley, and when brought into operation helped to save the lives of many World War II aircrews.

After the war, Rankine resumed his work with the Anglo-Iranian Oil Company for a few years before resigning from full-time work in 1947. He continued as an advisor for the company until 1954 when his health began to break down. Rankine died at the age of 74 in a nursing home in his home town of Hampton, London, on 20 January 1956,. His obituary was published in The Times and in Nature.

== Personal life ==
Rankine was married with four children, David (b. 1911), Peter (b. 1911), (Jean b. 1917) and Betty (date of birth unknown), and died in 1956 at the age of 74.

== Selected works ==
- Discussion on vision (A.O. Rankine, Allan Ferguson; The University Press, 1932)
- F.I.D.O. investigation wind tunnel experiments (A. O. Rankine, Petroleum Warfare Department, 1945)
