= A Slower Speed of Light =

2012 special relativity demonstration game

- Poster
- Developer: MIT Game Lab
- Engine: Unity
- Platforms: Windows, OS X, Linux
- Release: 2012
- Genre: First-person

A Slower Speed of Light is a 2012 freeware video game developed by MIT Game Lab that demonstrates the effects of special relativity by gradually slowing down the speed of light to a walking pace. The game runs on the Unity engine using its open-source OpenRelativity toolkit.

== Gameplay ==
In A Slower Speed of Light, the player controls the ghost of a young child who was killed in an unspecified accident. The child wants to "become one with light", but the speed of light is too fast for the child. This is solved through the use of magic orbs which, as each are collected, slow down the speed of light, until by the end it is at walking speed. These orbs are spread throughout the level. At the beginning of the game, walking around and collecting these orbs is easy; however, as the game progresses, the effects of special relativity become apparent. This gradually increases the difficulty of the game. After collecting all 100 orbs, a portal (as seen in the poster) appears. Entering the portal will open a tab explaining the effects of special relativity, and will also show the time the game was finished in. The time the game was completed in is displayed with both the actual real world time as well as the time your character experienced, which differs due to the simulated effects of special relativity.

== Effects of special relativity ==
As the game progresses, the light becomes slower, and therefore the effects of special relativity start to become more apparent, increasing the difficulty of the game. These effects include the relativistic Doppler effect (red/blue-shifting of visible light and the shifting of ultraviolet and infrared into the visible spectrum), the searchlight effect (increased brightness in the direction of travel), time dilation (difference between the passage of time perceived by the player and the outside world), length contraction and Terrell rotation (the perceived warping of the environment at near-light speeds), and the runtime effect (seeing objects in the past because of the speed of light).

== OpenRelativity ==
OpenRelativity is a toolkit designed for use with the proprietary Unity game engine. It was developed by MIT Game Lab during the development of A Slower Speed of Light. The toolkit allows for the accurate simulation of a 3D environment when light is slowed down. It is hosted on GitHub and has been published under the permissive MIT license.

== Use in education ==
A Slower Speed of Light was developed in hopes of being used as an educational tool to explain special relativity in an easy-to-understand fashion. The game is meant to be used as an interactive learning tool for those interested in physics.

== See also ==
- Numerical relativity
- Special relativity
