= Trouton's rule =

Linear relation between entropy of vaporization and boiling point

Enthalpies of melting and boiling for pure elements versus temperatures of transition, demonstrating Trouton's rule

In thermodynamics, Trouton's rule states that the (molar) entropy of vaporization has almost the same value, about 85–88 J/(K·mol), for various kinds of liquids at their boiling points. The entropy of vaporization is defined as the ratio between the enthalpy of vaporization and the boiling temperature. It is named after Frederick Thomas Trouton.

It is expressed as a function of the gas constant R:

$$\Delta \bar S_\text{vap} \approx 10.5 R.$$

A similar way of stating this (Trouton's ratio) is that the latent heat is connected to boiling point roughly as

$$\frac{L_\text{vap}}{T_\text{boiling}} \approx 85{-}88\ \frac{\text{J}}{\text{K} \cdot \text{mol}}.$$

Trouton's rule can be explained by using Boltzmann's definition of entropy to the relative change in free volume (that is, space available for movement) between the liquid and vapour phases. It is valid for many liquids; for instance, the entropy of vaporization of toluene is 87.30 J/(K·mol), that of benzene is 89.45 J/(K·mol), and that of chloroform is 87.92 J/(K·mol). Because of its convenience, the rule is used to estimate the enthalpy of vaporization of liquids whose boiling points are known.

The rule, however, has some exceptions. For example, the entropies of vaporization of water, ethanol, formic acid and hydrogen fluoride are far from the predicted values. The entropy of vaporization of XeF_{6} at its boiling point has the extraordinarily high value of 136.9 J/(K·mol), or 16.5R. The characteristic of those liquids to which Trouton's rule cannot be applied is their special interaction between molecules, such as hydrogen bonding. The entropy of vaporization of water and ethanol shows positive deviance from the rule; this is because the hydrogen bonding in the liquid phase lessens the entropy of the phase. In contrast, the entropy of vaporization of formic acid has negative deviance. This fact indicates the existence of an orderly structure in the gas phase; it is known that formic acid forms a dimer structure even in the gas phase. Negative deviance can also occur as a result of a small gas-phase entropy owing to a low population of excited rotational states in the gas phase, particularly in small molecules such as methane – a small moment of inertia I giving rise to a large rotational constant B, with correspondingly widely separated rotational energy levels and, according to Maxwell–Boltzmann distribution, a small population of excited rotational states, and hence a low rotational entropy. The validity of Trouton's rule can be increased by considering

$$\Delta \bar S_\text{vap} \approx 4.5R + R \ln T.$$

Here, if T = 400 K, the right-hand side of the equation equals 10.5R, and we find the original formulation for Trouton's rule.
