= Phonodeik =

Sound recording device that converts sounds into images

The Phonodeik is a sound-recording apparatus invented by Dayton Miller in 1908. The Phonodeik converts sound waves into visual images. The name was suggested by Edward W. Morley. Before electronic oscilloscopes, this device was used for analyzing sound waves. The Phonodeik can be modified to project sound waves on a screen for public demonstration.

== Description ==
The Phonodeik used photographic material to record sound. A diaphragm receiver of thin glass is at the end of a resonator horn. Behind the diaphragm is a steel pulley spindle mounted in jeweled bearings with an attached mirror and oscillating tension spring. Wrapped on the pulley spindle are thin silk fibers or platinum wire turning around the mirror with amplitude. The sound vibrates the diaphragm on the bottom and a light beam is reflected to the sensitive photographic paper (or a projection screen).

== See also ==
- Oscilloscope
- Sonograph
- Phonautograph
- Kymograph

== External links and references ==
- "Lecture III -- Methods of recording and photographing sound waves -- Phonodeik". The science of musical sounds.
- Hoekje, Peter L. and William Fickinger, "Acoustic teaching apparatus before 1929 at the Case School of Applied Science".
- Gilliam, L., and W. Lichtenwanger, "The Dayton C. Miller Flute Collection: A Checklist of the Instruments". Washington, D.C.: Library of Congress. 1961. [via American Memory]
- Greenslade, Jr., Thomas B., "The Sonograph ". Instruments for Natural Philosophy, Kenyon College, Gambier, Ohio.
- "fonodèik". Enciclopedia Generale. (Italian)
- Miller, Dayton, Sound Waves: Their Shape and Speed. 1937.
- Miller, Dayton. The Science of Musical Sounds. 1916.
- The Dead Media Archive's entry on the Phonodeik
- Lindon W Bates. U.S. patent 1,294,861, Method of and apparatus for recording sounds.
