= Henry Gale (astrophysicist) =

American astrophysicist and author (1874–1942)

Henry Gordon Gale
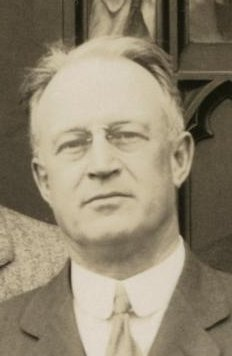
- Gale circa 1929
- Born: September 12, 1874; Aurora, Illinois
- Died: November 16, 1942 (aged 68)
- Known for: Michelson–Gale–Pearson experiment
- Scientific career
- Fields: Physics

Henry Gordon Gale (September 12, 1874 – November 16, 1942) was an American astrophysicist and author.

== Biography ==
He was born in Aurora, Illinois to Adalaide Rhoda (née Parker) and Eli Holbrook Gale, a physician. His mother died a few weeks after his birth; thereafter he was raised by his maternal grandparents.

Gale gained his bachelor's degree at the University of Chicago in 1896, where he also gained his PhD in physics in 1899, joining the faculty the same year. He was a member of the Delta Kappa Epsilon fraternity. During his studies he met Agnes Spofford Cook, who later became a children's author. She was also the daughter of Dr. John W. Cook, who was an educator and the first president of the Northern Illinois University in DeKalb. Gale and Agnes married in 1901, and their daughter Beatrice was born in 1904. In correspondence, they used the names "Bitty Wa" or "Wa Wa" for Agnes Gale, "Buck Wa" for Henry Gale and "Bims" for Beatrice. He was Dean of the Colleges (1908–22). His work in astrophysics was divided between the University of Chicago and the Mount Wilson Observatory in Pasadena, California. In 1909, he was badly burned in an electrical accident at the Observatory and he required skin grafts during two months' hospitalization. He was one of the editors of the Astrophysical Journal (1912–40). He became a full professor at the university from 1916. During World War I he served in the United States and France, obtaining the rank of lieutenant colonel. He was cited by general John J. Pershing for "especially meritorious and conspicuous service" and he was awarded the Legion of Honor by the French authorities.

After his return from Europe, he continued his role and became Dean of the Ogden School of Graduate Sciences (1922–30), Chairman of the Department of Physics (1925-40), and Dean of the Division of Physical Sciences (1931–40). He was President of the Physics Club of Chicago (1931–40). Gale authored dozens of papers and books. His physics textbooks from 1906 to 1936 included (with former Chicago professor Robert Millikan) A First Course in Physics, A First Course in Laboratory Physics for Secondary Schools, Practical Physics, and New Elementary Physics.

In 1938, Gale's racism became a prominent issue after Otto Struve organised an astronomy course at the university to be taught by Yerkes Observatory staff, including future Nobel Prize-winner, the Indian Subrahmanyan Chandrasekhar. Struve had encouraged Chandrasekhar to join the university, supported by president Robert Hutchins. Gale objected to Chandrasekhar because he wasn't white and made it clear he would not be welcome as long as he was the dean of faculty (Gale's writing partner, Millikan, supported eugenics as a trustee of the Human Betterment Foundation). His successor, Arthur Compton, openly accepted Chandrasekhar upon Gale's retirement.
