= Dayton Miller =

American physicist (1866–1941)

Dayton C. Miller
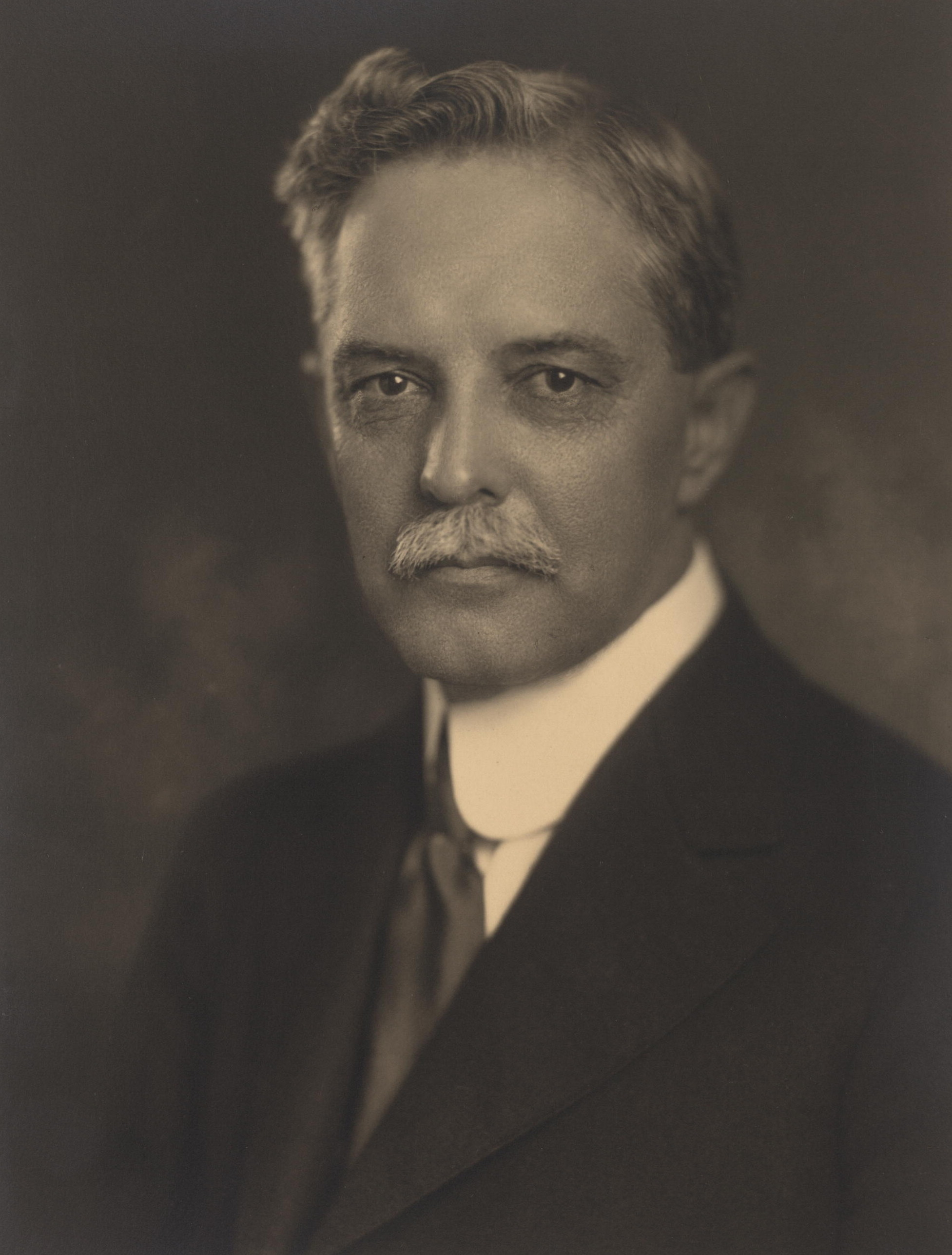
- Circa 1921
- Born: March 13, 1866; Strongsville, Ohio, USA
- Died: February 22, 1941 (aged 74); Cleveland, Ohio, U.S.
- Resting place: Lake View Cemetery, Cleveland, Ohio
- Education: Princeton University
- Known for: X-rays; Aether theory Absolute space Acoustics
- Awards: Edward Longstreth Medal (1917); Newcomb Cleveland Prize (1925); Elliott Cresson Medal (1927)
- Scientific career
- Fields: Physicist
- Workplaces: Case School of Applied Science
- Doctoral advisor: Charles A. Young

Dayton Clarence Miller (March 13, 1866 – February 22, 1941) was an American physicist, astronomer, acoustician, and accomplished amateur flautist. An early experimenter with X-rays, Miller was an advocate of aether theory and absolute space and an opponent of Albert Einstein's theory of relativity.

Born in Ohio to Charles Webster Dewey and Vienna Pomeroy Miller, he graduated from Baldwin University in 1886 and obtained a doctorate in astronomy at Princeton University under Charles A. Young in 1890. Miller spent his entire career teaching physics at the Case School of Applied Science in Cleveland, Ohio, as head of the physics department from 1893 until his retirement in 1936. Following the discovery of X-rays by Wilhelm Röntgen in 1895, Miller used cathode-ray tubes built by William Crookes to make some of the first photographic images of concealed objects, including a bullet within a man's limb. Active in many scientific organizations, Miller was a member of the American Academy of Arts and Sciences and the American Philosophical Society. During the 1920s, he served as secretary, vice president, and president of the American Physical Society and as chairman of the division of Physical Sciences of the National Research Council. Miller was a founding member of the Acoustical Society of America (ASA) and was the ASA president from 1931 to 1933.

== Scientific contributions ==
=== Aether research ===
In 1900, he began work with Edward Morley on the detection of aether drift, at the time one of the "hot" areas of fundamental physics. Following on with the basic apparatus as the earlier Michelson–Morley experiment, Miller and Morley published another null result in 1904. These experimental results were later cited in support of Albert Einstein's theory of relativity. Miller continued to work on refining his experimental techniques after 1904, conducting millions of measurements on aether drift, and eventually developing the most sensitive interferometer in the world at that time.

Dayton Miller performed over 326,000 turns of interferometer with 16 readings each one, (more than 5,200,000 measurements). They showed what appeared to be a small amount of drift (about 9 km/s, 1/3 of the velocity of the Earth around the Sun). With white light and 32 m arms he could see nearly always the same result:

- A shift amplitude of 0.12 ± 0.01 fringe, incompatible with zero.
- A shift phase that points to an apex in the constellation Dorado.

The amplitude analysis suggests a drag of aether. But the analysis of phase suggests that the Solar System goes towards the constellation Dorado at a speed of 227 km/s.

These results were presented by Miller as a positive indication of the existence of an aether drift. However, the effect Miller saw was tiny – much smaller than would be expected for a stationary aether. In order for these results to be consistent with an aether, it had to be assumed that the aether was dragged along with the Earth to a much greater extent than aether theories typically predicted. Values that high could be eliminated due to other physical phenomenon like stellar aberration, which put upper limits on the amount of dragging. Furthermore, the measurement was statistically far from any other measurements being carried on at the time. Fringe shifts of about 0.01 were being observed in many experiments, while Miller's 0.08 was not duplicated anywhere else, including Miller's own 1904 experiments with Morley, which showed a drift of only 0.015.

Based on an error analysis, Miller's critics argued that he overestimated the precision of his results, and that his measurements were actually perfectly consistent with a fringe difference of zero—the null result that every other experiment was recording. However, Miller continued to defend his results, claiming that the probable reason for the so-called null results were that they were not being done at high locations (such as mountain tops), where the ether wind (drift) was supposedly much higher due to less ether drag.

Einstein was interested in this aether drift theory and acknowledged that a positive result for the existence of aether would invalidate the theory of special relativity, but commented that altitudal influences and temperatures may have provided sources of error in the findings. Miller commented:

The trouble with Professor Einstein is that he knows nothing about my results. [...] He ought to give me credit for knowing that temperature differences would affect the results. He wrote to me in November suggesting this. I am not so simple as to make no allowance for temperature.

Miller noted that the results never displayed a periodic shift that was correlated to civil time (the day-night cycle), as would be expected if there was a measurable thermal effect related to solar heating - the periodic shift was always correlated to sidereal time (what spot among the constellations the apparatus was pointing towards), which would happen at different times of day or night according to the time of year.

During the 1920s a number of experiments, both interferometry-based, as in Miller's experiment, and others using entirely different techniques, were conducted, and these returned a null result as well. Even at the time, Miller's work was increasingly considered to be a statistical anomaly, an opinion that remains true today, given an ever-growing body of negative results. For example, Georg Joos reprised Miller's experiment using a very similar setup (the arms of his interferometer were 21 m vs. the 32 m in the Miller experiment) and obtained results that were 1/50 the magnitude of those from Miller's (see Michelson–Morley experiment#Subsequent experiments). However, Miller claimed that the explanation for results of the experiments of Georg Joos were because they were done at low altitude in the interior of a building, where the aether wind was very low. However, in the final summary of his various experiments, Miller agrees that the results of his experiments do not vary whether the experiment was performed in Cleveland or on Mount Wilson, making the ether drag argument problematic.

=== Shankland analysis ===
In 1955, Robert S. Shankland, S. W. McCuskey, F. C. Leone, and G. Kuerti performed a re-analysis of Miller's results. Shankland, who led the report, noted that the "signal" that Miller observed in 1933 is actually composed of points that are an average of several hundred measurements each, and the magnitude of the signal is more than 10 times smaller than the resolution with which the measurements were recorded. Miller's extraction of a single value for the measurement is statistically impossible, the data is too variable to say "this" number is any better than "that"—the data, from Shankland's position, supports a null result as equally as Miller's positive.

Shankland concluded that Miller's observed signal was partly due to statistical fluctuations and partly due to local temperature conditions, and also suggested that the results of Miller were due to a systematic error rather than an observed existence of aether. In particular, he felt that Miller did not take enough care in guarding against thermal gradients in the room where the experiment took place, as, unlike most interferometry experiments, Miller conducted his in a room where the apparatus was deliberately left open to the elements to some degree.

In Shankland's analysis, no statistically significant signal for the existence of aether was found. Shankland concluded that Miller's observed signal was spurious, due mainly to uncontrolled temperature effects rather than to the observed existence of an aether. In addition, some mainstream scientists today have argued that any signal that Miller observed was the result of the experimenter effect, i.e., a bias introduced by the experimenter's wish to find a certain result, which was a common source of systematic error in statistical analysis of data before modern experimental techniques were developed. (This effect was not addressed by name in Miller's early textbook on experimental techniques; see Ginn & Company, 1903).

=== Other endeavors ===
Dr. Miller published manuals designed to be student handbooks for the performance of experimental problems in physics. In 1908, Miller's interest in acoustics led him to develop a machine to record sound waves photographically, called the phonodeik. He used the machine to compare the waveforms produced by flutes crafted from different materials. During World War I, Miller worked with the physical characteristics of pressure waves of large guns at the request of the government. Dayton Miller was elected to the National Academy of Sciences in 1921. He was a member of the National Research Council in Washington, D.C. from 1927 to 1930.

== Published works ==
- Laboratory Physics, a Student's Manual for Colleges and Scientific Schools. (New York: Ginn & Company, 1903)
- Extract from a Letter dated Cleveland, Ohio, August 5th, 1904, to Lord Kelvin from Profs. Edward W. Morley and Dayton C. Miller., (Philosophical Magazine, S. 6, Vol. 8. No. 48, Dec. 1904, pp. 753–754)
- On the Theory of Experiments to detect Aberrations of the Second Degree. (with Edward Morley, Philosophical Magazine, S. 6, Vol. 9. No. 53, May 1905, pp. 669–680)
- Report of an experiment to detect the Fitzgerald-Lorentz Effect (with Edward Morley, Proceedings of the American Academy of Arts and Sciences, Vol. XLI, No. 12. 1905)
- Final Report on Ether-drift Experiments (with Edward Morley, Science, Vol. XXV, No. 2. p. 525, 1907)
- The Science of Musical Sounds (New York: The Macmillan Company, 1916, revised 1926)
- Anecdotal History of the Science of Sound (New York: The Macmillan Company, 1935)
- Sound Waves: Their Shape and Speed (New York: The Macmillan Company, 1937)
- Sparks, Lightning and Cosmic Rays (New York: The Macmillan Company, 1939)
- The Ether-Drift Experiments and the Determination of the Absolute Motion of the Earth (Reviews of Modern Physics 5, 203-242 (1933))

== See also ==
- Aether and Luminiferous aether
- History of physics
- List of physics topics
- Michelson–Morley experiment

== References and external links ==
Main

- "Dayton Clarence Miller". Today in Science, March 13 - births.
- "Dayton Miller images". American Institute of Physics, 2003.
- William Fickinger "Miller's Waves" an Informal Scientific Biography 2011.

Other endeavors

- Dayton C. Miller Collection online and full collection at The Library of Congress.
- Dayton Miller's acoustics collection, describing his research in acoustics
- "The Phonodeik". The science of musical sounds.
- "Professor Dayton Miller's Research in Acoustics ". Engineering Sciences E-129.
- "Crookes x-ray tubes" Dittrick Medical History Center, Case Western Reserve University. 2004.
