= Paul Harzer =

German mathematician and astronomer

Paul Harzer (1857, Großenhain – 1932) was a German mathematician and astronomer best known for his papers arguing with Albert Einstein regarding the Sagnac effect and its relationship to Special Relativity. Harzer was Professor of Astronomy at the University of Kiel and Director of its observatory. His published article on the experiment of Franz Harress drew two reply articles from Einstein.
