= Sagnac effect =

Relativistic effect due to rotation

Figure 1. Schematic representation of a Sagnac interferometer.

The Sagnac effect, also called Sagnac interference, named after French physicist Georges Sagnac, is a phenomenon encountered in interferometry that is elicited by rotation. The Sagnac effect manifests itself in a setup called a ring interferometer or Sagnac interferometer. A beam of light is split and the two beams are made to follow the same path but in opposite directions. On return to the point of entry the two light beams are allowed to exit the ring and undergo interference. The relative phases of the two exiting beams, and thus the position of the interference fringes, are shifted according to the in-plane angular velocity of the apparatus. In other words, when the interferometer is at rest with respect to a nonrotating frame, the light takes the same amount of time to traverse the ring in either direction. However, when the interferometer system is spun about an axis with some component normal to the ring, one beam of light has a longer path to travel than the other in order to complete one circuit of the mechanical frame, and so takes longer, resulting in a phase difference between the two beams. Georges Sagnac set up this experiment in 1913 in an attempt to prove the existence of the aether that Einstein's theory of special relativity makes superfluous.

A gimbal mounted mechanical gyroscope remains pointing in the same direction after spinning up, and thus can be used as a rotational reference for an inertial navigation system. With the development of so-called laser gyroscopes and fiber optic gyroscopes based on the Sagnac effect, bulky mechanical gyroscopes can be replaced by those with no moving parts in many modern inertial navigation systems. A conventional gyroscope relies on the principle of conservation of angular momentum whereas the sensitivity of the ring interferometer to rotation arises from the invariance of the speed of light for all inertial frames of reference.

== Description and operation ==
Figure 2. A guided wave Sagnac interferometer, or fibre optic gyroscope, can be realized using an optical fiber in a single or multiple loops.

Typically three or more mirrors are used, so that counter-propagating light beams follow a closed path such as a triangle or square (Fig. 1). Alternatively fiber optics can be employed to guide the light through a closed path (Fig. 2). If the platform on which the ring interferometer is mounted is rotating, the interference fringes are displaced compared to their position when the platform is not rotating. The amount of displacement is proportional to the angular velocity of the rotating platform. The axis of rotation does not have to be inside the enclosed area. The phase shift of the interference fringes is proportional to the platform's in-plane angular frequency $\boldsymbol{\Omega}$ and is given by a formula originally derived by Sagnac:
$$\Delta \phi\approx \frac {8 \pi} {\lambda c}\boldsymbol{\Omega}\cdot \mathbf{A}$$
where $\mathbf{A}$ is the oriented area of the loop and $\lambda$ the wavelength of light.

The effect is a consequence of the different times it takes right and left moving light beams to complete a full round trip in the interferometer ring. The difference in travel times, when multiplied by the optical frequency $c / \lambda,$ determines the phase difference $\Delta \phi.$

The rotation thus measured is an absolute rotation, that is, the platform's rotation with respect to an inertial reference frame.

== History ==
The Michelson–Morley experiment of 1887 had suggested that the hypothetical luminiferous aether, if it existed, was completely dragged by the Earth. To test this hypothesis, Oliver Lodge in 1897 proposed that a giant ring interferometer be constructed to measure the rotation of the Earth; a similar suggestion was made by Albert Abraham Michelson in 1904. They hoped that with such an interferometer, it would be possible to decide between a stationary aether, versus aethers which are partially or completely dragged by the Earth. That is, if the hypothetical aether were carried along by the Earth (or by the interferometer) the result would be negative, while a stationary aether would give a positive result.

The first description of the Sagnac effect in the framework of special relativity was done by Max von Laue in 1911, two years before Sagnac conducted his experiment. By continuing the theoretical work of Michelson (1904), von Laue confined himself to an inertial frame of reference (which he called a "valid" reference frame), and in a footnote he wrote "a system which rotates in respect to a valid system $K^0$ is not valid". Assuming constant light speed $c$, and setting the rotational velocity as $\Omega$, he computed the propagation time $\tau_{+}$ of one ray and $\tau_{-}$ of the counter-propagating ray, and consequently obtained the time difference $\Delta\tau=\tau_{+}-\tau_{-}$. He concluded that this interferometer experiment would indeed produce (when restricted to terms of first order in $v/c$) the same positive result for both special relativity and the stationary aether (the latter he called "absolute theory" in reference to the 1895-theory of Lorentz). He also concluded that only complete-aether-drag models (such as the ones of Stokes or Hertz) would give a negative result.

The first interferometry experiment aimed at observing the correlation of angular velocity and phase-shift was performed by the French scientist Georges Sagnac in 1913. Its purpose was to detect "the effect of the relative motion of the ether". Sagnac believed that his results constituted proof of the existence of a stationary aether. However, as explained above, von Laue already showed in 1911 that this effect is consistent with special relativity. Unlike the carefully prepared Michelson–Morley experiment which was set up to prove an aether wind caused by earth drag, the Sagnac experiment could not prove this type of aether wind because a universal aether would affect all parts of the rotating light equally.

Einstein was aware of the phenomenon of the Sagnac effect through the earlier experiments of Franz Harress in 1911. Harress' experiment had been aimed at making measurements of the Fresnel drag of light propagating through moving glass. Not aware of the Sagnac effect, Harress had realized the presence of an "unexpected bias" in his measurements, but was unable to explain its cause. Harress' analysis of the results contained an error, and they were reanalyzed in 1914 by Paul Harzer, who claimed the results were at odds with special relativity. This was rebutted by Einstein. Harress himself died during the First World War, and his results were not publicly available until von Laue persuaded Otto Knopf, whose assistant Harress had been, to publish them in 1920.

Harress' results were published together with an analysis by von Laue, who showed the role of the Sagnac effect in the experiment. Laue said that in the Harress experiment there was a calculable difference in time due to both the dragging of light (which follows from the relativistic velocity addition in moving media, i.e. in moving glass) and "the fact that every part of the rotating apparatus runs away from one ray, while it approaches the other one", i.e. the Sagnac effect. He acknowledged that this latter effect alone could cause the time variance and, therefore, "the accelerations connected with the rotation in no way influence the speed of light".

While Laue's explanation is based on inertial frames, Paul Langevin (1921, 1937) and others described the same effect when viewed from rotating reference frames (in both special and general relativity, see Born coordinates). So when the Sagnac effect should be described from the viewpoint of a corotating frame, one can use ordinary rotating cylindrical coordinates and apply them to the Minkowski metric, which results into the so-called Born metric or Langevin metric. From these coordinates, one can derive the different arrival times of counter-propagating rays, an effect which was shown by Paul Langevin (1921). Or when these coordinates are used to compute the global speed of light in rotating frames, different apparent light speeds are derived depending on the orientation, an effect which was shown by Langevin in another paper (1937).

This does not contradict special relativity and the above explanation by von Laue that the speed of light is not affected by accelerations. Because this apparent variable light speed in rotating frames only arises if rotating coordinates are used, whereas if the Sagnac effect is described from the viewpoint of an external inertial coordinate frame the speed of light of course remains constant – so the Sagnac effect arises no matter whether one uses inertial coordinates (see the formulas in section § Theories below) or rotating coordinates (see the formulas in section § Reference frames below). That is, special relativity in its original formulation was adapted to inertial coordinate frames, not rotating frames. Albert Einstein in his paper introducing special relativity stated, "light is always propagated in empty space with a definite velocity c which is independent of the state of motion of the emitting body". Einstein specifically stated that light speed is only constant in the vacuum of empty space, using equations that only held in linear and parallel inertial frames. However, when Einstein started to investigate accelerated reference frames, he noticed that "the principle of the constancy of light must be modified" for accelerating frames of reference.

Max von Laue in his 1920 paper gave serious consideration to the effect of general relativity on the Sagnac effect stating, "General relativity would of course be capable of giving some statements about it, and we want to show at first that no noticeable influences of acceleration are expected according to it." He makes a footnote regarding discussions with German physicist, Wilhelm Wien. The reason for looking at general relativity is because Einstein's theory of general relativity predicted that light would slow down in a gravitational field which is why it could predict the curvature of light around a massive body. Under general relativity, there is the equivalence principle which states that gravity and acceleration are equivalent. Spinning or accelerating an interferometer creates a gravitational effect. "There are, however, two different types of such [non-inertial] motion; it may for instance be acceleration in a straight line, or circular motion with constant speed." Also, Irwin Shapiro in 1964 explained general relativity saying, "the speed of a light wave depends on the strength of the gravitational potential along its path". This is called the Shapiro delay. However, since the gravitational field would have to be significant, Laue (1920) concluded it is more likely that the effect is a result of changing the distance of the path by its movement through space. "The beam traveling around the loop in the direction of rotation will have farther to go than the beam traveling counter to the direction of rotation, because during the period of travel the mirrors and detector will all move (slightly) toward the counter-rotating beam and away from the co-rotating beam. Consequently the beams will reach the detector at slightly different times, and slightly out of phase, producing optical interference 'fringes' that can be observed and measured."

In 1926, an ambitious ring interferometry experiment was set up by Albert Michelson and Henry Gale. The aim was to find out whether the rotation of the Earth has an effect on the propagation of light in the vicinity of the Earth. The Michelson–Gale–Pearson experiment was a very large ring interferometer, (a perimeter of 1.9 kilometer), large enough to detect the angular velocity of the Earth. The outcome of the experiment was that the angular velocity of the Earth as measured by astronomy was confirmed to within measuring accuracy. The ring interferometer of the Michelson–Gale experiment was not calibrated by comparison with an outside reference (which was not possible, because the setup was fixed to the Earth). From its design it could be deduced where the central interference fringe ought to be if there would be zero shift. The measured shift was 230 parts in 1000, with an accuracy of 5 parts in 1000. The predicted shift was 237 parts in 1000.

The Sagnac effect has stimulated a century long debate on its meaning and interpretation, much of this debate being surprising since the effect is perfectly well understood in the context of special relativity.

== Theory ==
=== Basic case ===
Figure 3. Light traveling opposite directions go different distances before reaching the moving source

The shift in interference fringes in a ring interferometer can be viewed intuitively as a consequence of the different distances that light travels due to the rotation of the ring.(Fig. 3) The simplest derivation is for a circular ring of radius R, with a refractive index of one, rotating at an angular velocity of $\Omega$, but the result is general for loop geometries with other shapes. If a light source emits in both directions from one point on the rotating ring, light traveling in the same direction as the rotation direction needs to travel more than one circumference around the ring before it catches up with the light source from behind. The time $t_1$ that it takes to catch up with the light source is given by:

$$t_1 = \frac {2 \pi R + \Delta L} c$$

$\Delta L$ is the distance (black bold arrow in Fig. 3) that the mirror has moved in that same time:

$$\Delta L  =  R \Omega t_1. \,$$

Eliminating $\Delta L$ from the two equations above we get:

$$t_1 = \frac {2 \pi R }{c -  R \Omega}.$$

Likewise, the light traveling in the opposite direction of the rotation will travel less than one circumference before hitting the light source on the front side. So the time for this direction of light to reach the moving source again is:

$$t_2 = \frac {2 \pi R }{c +  R \Omega}.$$

The time difference is

$$\Delta t = t_1 - t_2 = \frac {4 \pi R^2 \Omega }{c^2-R^2 \Omega^2} .$$

For $R \Omega = v \ll c$, this reduces to

$$\Delta t \approx \frac {4 \pi R^2 \Omega} {c^2} = \frac {4 A \Omega} { c^2},$$

where A is the area of the ring.

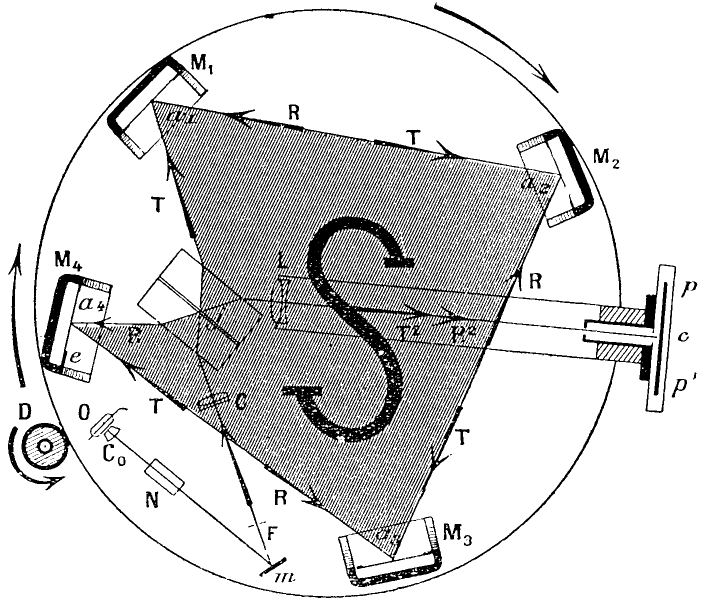
Figure 4. The Sagnac area formula applies to any shape of loop.

Although this simple derivation is for a circular ring with an index of refraction of one, the result holds true for any shape of rotating loop with area A.(Fig. 4)

For more complicated shapes, or other refractive index values, the same result can be derived by calculating the optical phase shift in each direction using Fermat's principle and taking into account the different phase velocities for the different propagation directions in an inertial laboratory frame, which can be calculated using relativistic addition of velocities.

We imagine a screen for viewing fringes placed at the light source (or we use a beamsplitter to send light from the source point to the screen). Given a steady light source, interference fringes will form on the screen with a fringe displacement proportional to the time differences required for the two counter-rotating beams to traverse the circuit. The phase shift is $\Delta \phi=\frac { 2 \pi c \, \Delta t }{\lambda}$, which causes fringes to shift in proportion to $A$ and $\Omega$ .

At non-relativistic speeds, the Sagnac effect is a simple consequence of the source independence of the speed of light. In other words, the Sagnac experiment does not distinguish between pre-relativistic physics and relativistic physics.

When light propagates in fibre optic cable, the setup is effectively a combination of a Sagnac experiment and the Fizeau experiment. In glass the speed of light is slower than in vacuum, and the optical cable is the moving medium. In that case the relativistic velocity addition rule applies. Pre-relativistic theories of light propagation cannot account for the Fizeau effect. (By 1900 Lorentz could account for the Fizeau effect, but by that time his theory had evolved to a form where in effect it was mathematically equivalent to special relativity.)

Since emitter and detector are traveling at the same speeds, Doppler effects cancel out, so the Sagnac effect does not involve the Doppler effect. In the case of ring laser interferometry, it is important to be aware of this. When the ring laser setup is rotating, the counterpropagating beams undergo frequency shifts in opposite directions. This frequency shift is not a Doppler shift, but is rather an optical cavity resonance effect, as explained below in Ring lasers.

The Sagnac effect is well understood in the context of special relativity where from the rotating light source's point of view the phase difference is due to the line of simultaneity along the light path not forming a closed loop in spacetime.

=== Generalized formula ===
Figure 5. Conceptually, a conventional fibre optic gyro (FOG), shown on the left, can be divided into two semicircular sections with extended fibre connecting the end sections as shown on the right, creating a fibre optic conveyor (FOC).

Modified versions of the experiment have been proposed with the light source allowed to move along a (not necessarily circular) light path. This configuration introduces another reason for the phase difference: according to the light source the two signals now follow different paths in space. Some authors refer to this effect as Sagnac effect although in this case the discrepancy need not be due to the lines of simultaneity not forming closed loops.

An example of the modified configuration is shown in Fig. 5, the measured phase difference in both a standard fibre optic gyroscope, shown on the left, and a modified fibre optic conveyor, shown on the right, conform to the equation Δt = 2vL/c^{2}, whose derivation is based on the constant speed of light. It is evident from this formula that the total time delay is equal to the cumulative time delays along the entire length of fibre, regardless whether the fibre is in a rotating section of the conveyor, or a straight section.

This equation is invalid, however, if the light source's path in space does not follow that of the light signals, for example in the standard rotating platform case (FOG) but with a non-circular light path. In this case the phase difference formula necessarily involves the area enclosed by the light path due to Stokes' theorem.

Fig. 4: A closed optical fiber moving arbitrarily in space without stretching.

Consider a ring interferometer where two counter-propagating light beams share a common optical path determined by a loop of an optical fiber, see Figure 4. The loop may have an arbitrary shape, and can move arbitrarily in space. The only restriction is that it is not allowed to stretch. (The case of a circular ring interferometer rotating about its center in free space is recovered by taking the index of refraction of the fiber to be 1.)

Consider a small segment of the fiber, whose length in its rest frame is $d\ell'$. The time intervals, $dt'_\pm$, it takes the left and right moving light rays to traverse the segment in the rest frame coincide and are given by
$$dt'_\pm={n \over c} d \ell'$$
Let $d\ell=|d\mathbf{x}|$ be the length of this small segment in the lab frame. By the relativistic length contraction formula, $d\ell'=\gamma d\ell\approx d\ell$ correct to first order in the velocity $\mathbf{v}$ of the segment. The time intervals $dt_\pm$ for traversing the segment in the lab frame are given by Lorentz transformation as:
$$dt_\pm=\gamma \left(dt' \pm \frac{\mathbf{v}\cdot d\mathbf{x}'}{c^2}\right)\approx \frac n c d\ell \pm \frac{\mathbf{v}}{c^2}\cdot d\mathbf{x}$$
correct to first order in the velocity $\mathbf{v}$. In general, the two beams will visit a given segment at slightly different times, but, in the absence of stretching, the length $d\ell$ is the same for both beams.

It follows that the time difference for completing a cycle for the two beams is
$$\Delta T= \int \left(dt_+-dt_-\right)\approx \frac 2 {c^2} \oint  \mathbf{v}\cdot d\mathbf{x}$$
Remarkably, the time difference is independent of the refraction index $n$ and the velocity of light in the fiber.

Imagine a screen for viewing fringes placed at the light source (alternatively, use a beamsplitter to send light from the source point to the screen). Given a steady light source, interference fringes will form on the screen with a fringe displacement given by $\Delta \phi\approx \frac {2\pi c} {\lambda} \Delta T$ where the first factor is the frequency of light. This gives the generalized Sagnac formula
$$\Delta \phi\approx \frac {4\pi} {\lambda c} \oint \mathbf{v}\cdot d\mathbf{x}$$
In the special case that the fiber moves like a rigid body with angular frequency $\boldsymbol{\Omega}$, the velocity is $\mathbf{v}=\boldsymbol{\Omega}\times\mathbf{x}$ and the line integral can be computed in terms of the area of the loop:
$$\oint\mathbf{v}\cdot d\mathbf{x}=\oint\boldsymbol{\Omega}\times\mathbf{x}\cdot d\mathbf{x}=
\oint\boldsymbol{\Omega}\cdot\mathbf{x}\times d\mathbf{x}=2\oint\boldsymbol{\Omega}\cdot d\mathbf{A}=
2\boldsymbol{\Omega}\cdot \mathbf{A}$$
This gives Sagnac formula for ring interferometers of arbitrary shape and geometry
$$\Delta \phi\approx \frac {8 \pi} {\lambda c}\boldsymbol{\Omega}\cdot \mathbf{A}$$
If one also allows for stretching one recovers the Fizeau interference formula.

== Applications ==
A relay of pulses that circumnavigates the Earth, verifying precise synchronization, is also recognized as a case requiring correction for the Sagnac effect. In 1984 a verification was set up that involved three ground stations and several GPS satellites, with relays of signals both going eastward and westward around the world. In the case of a Sagnac interferometer a measure of difference in arrival time is obtained by producing interference fringes, and observing the fringe shift. In the case of a relay of pulses around the world the difference in arrival time is obtained directly from the actual arrival time of the pulses. In both cases the mechanism of the difference in arrival time is the same: the Sagnac effect.

The Hafele–Keating experiment is also recognized as a counterpart to Sagnac effect physics. In the actual Hafele–Keating experiment the mode of transport (long-distance flights) gave rise to time dilation effects of its own, and calculations were needed to separate the various contributions. For the (theoretical) case of clocks that are transported so slowly that time dilation effects arising from the transport are negligible the amount of time difference between the clocks when they arrive back at the starting point will be equal to the time difference that is found for a relay of pulses that travels around the world: 207 nanoseconds.

=== Practical uses ===
The Sagnac effect is employed in current technology. One use is in inertial guidance systems. Ring laser gyroscopes are extremely sensitive to rotations, which need to be accounted for if an inertial guidance system is to return accurate results. The ring laser also can detect the sidereal day, which can also be termed "mode 1".

Global navigation satellite systems (GNSSs) – such as GPS, GLONASS, COMPASS or Galileo – need to take the rotation of the Earth into account in the procedures of using radio signals to synchronize clocks.

=== Ring lasers ===
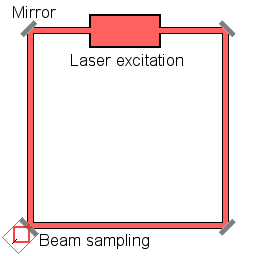
Figure 6. Schematic representation of a ring laser setup.

Fibre optic gyroscopes are sometimes referred to as 'passive ring interferometers'. A passive ring interferometer uses light entering the setup from outside. The interference pattern that is obtained is a fringe pattern, and what is measured is a phase shift.

It is also possible to construct a ring interferometer that is self-contained, based on a completely different arrangement. This is called a ring laser or ring laser gyroscope. The light is generated and sustained by incorporating laser excitation in the path of the light.

To understand what happens in a ring laser cavity, it is helpful to discuss the physics of the laser process in a laser setup with continuous generation of light. As the laser excitation is started, the molecules inside the cavity emit photons, but since the molecules have a thermal velocity, the light inside the laser cavity is at first a range of frequencies, corresponding to the statistical distribution of velocities. The process of stimulated emission makes one frequency quickly outcompete other frequencies, and after that the light is very close to monochromatic.

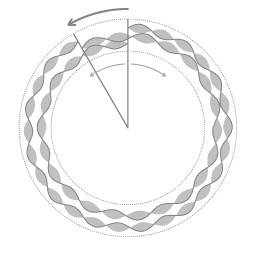
Figure 7. Schematic representation of the frequency shift when a ring laser interferometer is rotating. Both the counterpropagating light and the co-propagating light go through 12 cycles of their frequency.

For the sake of simplicity, assume that all emitted photons are emitted in a direction parallel to the ring. Fig. 7 illustrates the effect of the ring laser's rotation. In a linear laser, an integer multiple of the wavelength fits the length of the laser cavity. This means that in traveling back and forth the laser light goes through an integer number of cycles of its frequency. In the case of a ring laser the same applies: the number of cycles of the laser light's frequency is the same in both directions. This quality of the same number of cycles in both directions is preserved when the ring laser setup is rotating. The image illustrates that there is wavelength shift (hence a frequency shift) in such a way that the number of cycles is the same in both directions of propagation.

By bringing the two frequencies of laser light to interference a beat frequency can be obtained; the beat frequency is the difference between the two frequencies. This beat frequency can be thought of as an interference pattern in time. (The more familiar interference fringes of interferometry are a spatial pattern). The period of this beat frequency is linearly proportional to the angular velocity of the ring laser with respect to inertial space. This is the principle of the ring laser gyroscope, widely used in modern inertial navigation systems. Ring laser gyroscopes are also used in fundamental physice research for the detection of general relativity effects whose signature marks the Earth Rotation. In this case, the key requirement is the instrument sensitivity.

==== Zero point calibration ====
Figure 8. The red and blue dots represent counter-propagating photons, the grey dots represent molecules in the laser cavity.

In passive ring interferometers, the fringe displacement is proportional to the first derivative of angular position; careful calibration is required to determine the fringe displacement that corresponds to zero angular velocity of the ring interferometer setup. On the other hand, ring laser interferometers do not require calibration to determine the output that corresponds to zero angular velocity. Ring laser interferometers are self-calibrating. The beat frequency will be zero if and only if the ring laser setup is non-rotating with respect to inertial space.

Fig. 8 illustrates the physical property that makes the ring laser interferometer self-calibrating. The grey dots represent molecules in the laser cavity that act as resonators. Along every section of the ring cavity, the speed of light is the same in both directions. When the ring laser device is rotating, then it rotates with respect to that background. In other words: invariance of the speed of light provides the reference for the self-calibrating property of the ring laser interferometer.

==== Lock-in ====
Ring laser gyroscopes suffer from an effect known as "lock-in" at low rotation rates (less than 100°/h). At very low rotation rates, the frequencies of the counter-propagating laser modes become almost identical. In this case, crosstalk between the counter-propagating beams can result in injection locking, so that the standing wave "gets stuck" in a preferred phase, locking the frequency of each beam to each other rather than responding to gradual rotation. By rotationally dithering the laser cavity back and forth through a small angle at a rapid rate (hundreds of hertz), lock-in will only occur during the brief instances where the rotational velocity is close to zero; the errors thereby induced approximately cancel each other between alternating dead periods.

=== Fibre optic gyroscopes versus ring laser gyroscopes ===
Fibre optic gyros (FOGs) and ring laser gyros (RLGs) both operate by monitoring the difference in propagation time between beams of light traveling in clockwise and counterclockwise directions about a closed optical path. They differ considerably in various cost, reliability, size, weight, power, and other performance characteristics that need to be considered when evaluating these distinct technologies for a particular application.

RLGs require accurate machining, use of precision mirrors, and assembly under clean room conditions. Their mechanical dithering assemblies add somewhat to their weight but not appreciably. RLGs are capable of logging in excess of 100,000 hours of operation in near-room temperature conditions. Their lasers have relatively high power requirements.

Interferometric FOGs are purely solid-state, require no mechanical dithering components, do not require precision machining, have a flexible geometry, and can be made very small. They use many standard components from the telecom industry. In addition, the major optical components of FOGs have proven performance in the telecom industry, with lifespans measured in decades. However, the assembly of multiple optical components into a precision gyro instrument is costly. Analog FOGs offer the lowest possible cost but are limited in performance; digital FOGs offer the wide dynamic ranges and accurate scale factor corrections required for stringent applications. Use of longer and larger coils increases sensitivity at the cost of greater sensitivity to temperature variations and vibrations.

=== Zero-area Sagnac interferometer and gravitational wave detection ===
The Sagnac topology was actually first described by Michelson in 1886, who employed an even-reflection variant of this interferometer in a repetition of the Fizeau experiment. Michelson noted the extreme stability of the fringes produced by this form of interferometer: White-light fringes were observed immediately upon alignment of the mirrors. In dual-path interferometers, white-light fringes are difficult to obtain since the two path lengths must be matched to within a couple of micrometers (the coherence length of the white light). However, being a common-path interferometer, the Sagnac configuration inherently matches the two path lengths. Likewise Michelson observed that the fringe pattern would remain stable even while holding a lighted match below the optical path; in most interferometers the fringes would shift wildly due to the refractive index fluctuations from the warm air above the match. Sagnac interferometers are almost completely insensitive to displacements of the mirrors or beam-splitter. This characteristic of the Sagnac topology has led to their use in applications requiring exceptionally high stability.

Figure 9. Zero-area Sagnac interferometer

The fringe shift in a Sagnac interferometer due to rotation has a magnitude proportional to the enclosed area of the light path, and this area must be specified in relation to the axis of rotation. Thus the sign of the area of a loop is reversed when the loop is wound in the opposite direction (clockwise or anti-clockwise). A light path that includes loops in both directions, therefore, has a net area given by the difference between the areas of the clockwise and anti-clockwise loops. The special case of two equal but opposite loops is called a zero-area Sagnac interferometer. The result is an interferometer that exhibits the stability of the Sagnac topology while being insensitive to rotation.

The Laser Interferometer Gravitational-Wave Observatory (LIGO) consisted of two 4-km Michelson–Fabry–Pérot interferometers, and operated at a power level of about 100 watts of laser power at the beam splitter. After an upgrade to Advanced LIGO several kilowatts of laser power are required.

A variety of competing optical systems are being explored for third generation enhancements beyond Advanced LIGO. One of these competing proposals is based on the zero-area Sagnac design. With a light path consisting of two loops of the same area, but in opposite directions, an effective area of zero is obtained thus canceling the Sagnac effect in its usual sense. Although insensitive to low frequency mirror drift, laser frequency variation, reflectivity imbalance between the arms, and thermally induced birefringence, this configuration is nevertheless sensitive to passing gravitational waves at frequencies of astronomical interest. However, many considerations are involved in the choice of an optical system, and despite the zero-area Sagnac's superiority in certain areas, there is as yet no consensus choice of optical system for third generation LIGO.

== See also ==
- Born coordinates
- Fiber optic gyroscope
- Ring laser gyroscope
