= James Render Terrell Sr. =

American politician

Member of the Georgia House of Representatives
- In office 1935–1938

Personal details
- Born: August 10, 1868
- Occupation: Politician, lawyer, solicitor general

James Render Terrell Sr. (born August 10, 1868) was a lawyer, solicitor general, and state legislator in the United States state of Georgia. Two of his sons also served in the state legislature.

James Render Terrell Jr. served in the Georgia House of Representatives from 1935 to 1938 representing Troup County.
