= Anton Lampa =

Anton Lampa (17 January 1868 – 28 January 1938) was an Austrian physicist.

== Life ==
Lampa was born on 17 January 1868 in Pest. He studied mathematics and physics at the University of Vienna. In 1892 he obtained his doctorate with the dissertation Über die Absorption des Lichts in trüben Medien, which he conducted under the direction of Franz Serafin Exner. In 1897 he was habilitated, and in 1909 he became professor of experimental physics and head of the physics institute at the German University in Prague as successor to Ernst Lecher. In 1904 he was elected a member of the Leopoldina. After World War I, Lampa refused to stay in Prague and returned to Vienna in 1918 as Privatdozent. He joined the department of public education at the Ministry of Education and became professor extraordinarius at the University of Vienna in 1921. He retired in 1934. He died on 28 January 1938 in Vienna.

== Work ==
Lampa was an early supporter of the theory of relativity. In 1910, he successfully advocated for Albert Einstein to be appointed to his first full professorship at the German University of Prague. Lampa was greatly influenced by Ernst Mach, writing a well-known introduction to his philosophy in his biography of Mach. Lampa designed a device for generating and measuring extremely short electromagnetic waves and was particularly concerned with diffraction of electrical waves. His work on the diffraction coefficients of some substances for very short electrical waves received international attention. More recently (2024), a paper published by Lampa in 1924 on the optical perception of relativistically fast moving rods (Terrell effect) has become known again. In addition to his scientific work, Anton Lampa was particularly dedicated to education and was president of the Urania in Vienna from 1927 to 1936. Since 1973, a street in the district Donaustadt has been named after Lampa.

== Publications ==
- Naturkräfte und Naturgesetze. Gemeinverständliche Vorträge, 1895;
- Ernst Mach, 1918;
- Das naturwissenschaftliche Märchen. Eine Betrachtung, 1919;
- Wie erscheint nach der Relativitätstheorie ein bewegter Stab einem ruhenden Beobachter?. Zeitschrift für Physik. 27 (1): 138–148
- Die Kant-Laplacesche Theorie, 1925;
- Die Physik in der Kultur, 1925.
