= Michelson–Gale–Pearson experiment =

The Michelson–Gale–Pearson experiment (1925) is a modified version of the Michelson–Morley experiment and the Sagnac-Interferometer. It measured the Sagnac effect due to Earth's rotation, and thus tests the theories of special relativity and luminiferous ether along the rotating frame of Earth.

== Experiment ==
The aim, as it was first proposed by Albert A. Michelson in 1904 and then executed in 1925 by Michelson and Henry G. Gale, was to find out whether the rotation of the Earth has an effect on the propagation of light in the vicinity of the Earth. The Michelson-Gale experiment was a very large ring interferometer, (a perimeter of 1.9 kilometers), large enough to detect the angular velocity of the Earth. Like the original Michelson-Morley experiment, the Michelson-Gale-Pearson version compared the light from a single source (carbon arc) after travelling in two directions. The major change was to replace the two "arms" of the original MM version with two rectangles, one much larger than the other. Light was sent into the rectangles, reflecting off mirrors at the corners, and returned to the starting point. Light exiting the two rectangles was compared on a screen just as the light returning from the two arms would be in a standard MM experiment. The expected fringe shift in accordance with the stationary aether and special relativity was given by Michelson as:

$$\Delta=\frac{4A\omega\sin\phi}{\lambda c}$$

where $\Delta$ is the displacement in fringes, $A$ the area of the ring, $\phi$ the latitude of the experiment site in Clearing, Illinois (41° 46'), $c$ the speed of light, $\omega$ the angular velocity of Earth, $\lambda$ the effective wavelength used. In other words, this experiment was aimed to detect the Sagnac effect due to Earth's rotation.

== Result ==
The outcome of the experiment was that the angular velocity of the Earth as measured by astronomy was confirmed to within measuring accuracy. The ring interferometer of the Michelson-Gale experiment was not calibrated by comparison with an outside reference (which was not possible, because the setup was fixed to the Earth). From its design it could be deduced where the central interference fringe ought to be if there would be zero shift. The measured shift was 230 parts in 1000, with an accuracy of 5 parts in 1000. The predicted shift was 237 parts in 1000. According to Michelson/Gale, the experiment is compatible with both the idea of a stationary ether and special relativity.

As it was already pointed out by Michelson in 1904, a positive result in such experiments contradicts the hypothesis of complete aether drag, as the spinning surface of the Earth experiences an aether wind. The Michelson-Morley experiment shows on the contrary that a hypothetical aether could not be moving relative to the Earth, that is, as the Earth orbits it would have to drag the aether along. Those two results are not incompatible per se, but in the absence of a model to reconcile them, they are more ad hoc than the explanation of both experiments within special relativity. The experiment is consistent with relativity for the same reason as all other Sagnac type experiments (see Sagnac effect). That is, rotation is absolute in special relativity, because there is no inertial frame of reference in which the whole device is at rest during the complete process of rotation, thus the light paths of the two rays are different in all of those frames, consequently a positive result must occur. It's also possible to define rotating frames in special relativity (Born coordinates), yet in those frames the speed of light is not constant in extended areas any more, thus also in this view a positive result must occur. Today, Sagnac type effects due to Earth's rotation are routinely incorporated into GPS.
