= Nelson James Terrell =

American physicist (1923–2009)

James Terrell
- Born: Nelson James Terrell Jr. August 15, 1923; Houston, Texas
- Died: March 21, 2009 (aged 85); Los Alamos, New Mexico
- Education: Rice University
- Known for: Terrell rotation
- Scientific career
- Fields: Special relativity; Astrophysics
- Workplaces: Western Reserve University; Los Alamos National Laboratory

Nelson James Terrell (August 15, 1923 – March 21, 2009) was an American physicist who worked at the Los Alamos National Laboratory in New Mexico. The Terrell rotation, an image distortion of objects traveling near the speed of light, is named after him.

== Life ==
Nelson James Terrell Jr. was born in Houston, Texas in 1923.

James Terrell did his undergraduate studies at Rice University.

In 1945, he married Anne Elizabeth Pearson. Together, they had a daughter.

From 1945 to 1947, the U.S. Army sent Terrell to Japan. When he came back, he finished his PhD at Rice University in 1950. He worked on nuclear fission and the theory of relativity.

He worked as assistant professor at Western Reserve University, and later joined Los Alamos National Laboratory in 1951.

Terrell was member of the International Astronomical Union.

He died in Los Alamos, New Mexico in 2009.

== Research ==
In 1959, Terrell showed that according to special relativity, the appearance of objects looked rotated at high speed. Roger Penrose independently reached the same conclusion. This is now known as the Terrell rotation or Terrell effect. This prediction was observed in the laboratory in 2025.

In 1966, he studied quasars. He postulated that quasars were originally ejected from the center of galaxies. This conjecture was the matter of international debate.

In the 1970s he analyzed the X-ray data of Cygnus X-1, a black hole candidate, and that collected by the Vela B satellite. He produced a movie of the sky depicting dying stars, quasars, and black holes.

He also studied the diffraction problem of high intensity lasers.
