= Frederick Thomas Trouton =

Irish experimental physicist (1863–1922)

Frederick Thomas Trouton FRS
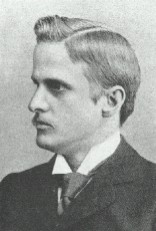
- Born: 24 November 1863; Dublin, Ireland
- Died: 21 September 1922 (aged 58); Down, Kent, England
- Education: Royal School Dungannon
- Alma mater: Trinity College Dublin (MA, DSc, 1884)
- Known for: Trouton's rule (1884); Trouton–Noble experiment (1903); Trouton–Rankine experiment (1908)
- Spouse: Anne Maria Fowler (m. 1887)
- Children: 7
- Awards: FRS (1897)
- Scientific career
- Fields: Experimental physics
- Workplaces: University College London
- Notable students: Edward Andrade

3rd Quain Professor of Physics
- In office 1902–1914
- Preceded by: Hugh Longbourne Callendar
- Succeeded by: William Henry Bragg

Frederick Thomas Trouton (/ˈtraʊtən/; 24 November 1863 – 21 September 1922) was an Irish experimental physicist known for Trouton's rule and his experiments attempting to detect the Earth's motion through the luminiferous aether.

== Life and work ==
Trouton was born in Dublin on 24 November 1863, the youngest son of the wealthy and prominent Thomas Trouton. He attended Royal School Dungannon and went on to Trinity College Dublin in 1884, where he studied engineering and physical science. While still an undergraduate student, Trouton observed a relationship between boiling points and energies of vaporisations, which he presented in two short papers. He found the change of entropy per mole for vaporisation at a boiling point is constant, or expressed mathematically ΔS_{m,vap} = 10.5 R (where R is the ideal gas constant). This became known as Trouton's rule and, despite having some exceptions, is used to estimate the enthalpy of vaporisation of liquids whose boiling points are known. Trouton himself belittled his discovery as it was merely the result of an afternoon's manipulation of data from a book of tables. Before graduating he also took a leading role in surveying for a railway.

Trouton graduated Master of Arts and Doctor of Science in 1884, and was immediately appointed assistant to the professor of experimental physics, George Francis FitzGerald. They collaborated on many experiments and became good friends; FitzGerald's influence can be seen in much of Trouton's early work.

Trouton was elected a Fellow of the Royal Society in June 1897. His application citation read: "Discovered the law connecting the latent heat of vaporisation and molecular weights of bodies known as "Trouton's law" and experimentally determined the directions of vibration of electric and magnetic force in plane polarised light. He has made other important observations on the phase of secondary waves and on the influence of the size of the reflector in Hertz's equipment."

A 1902 appointment as Quain Professor of Physics at University College London led to a 12-year career of experimental physics, including work on the Trouton-Rankine experiment. He received an OBE in 1918.

Trouton married Anne Maria Fowler in 1887 and they had four sons and three daughters. Their first two sons, Eric and Desmond, were killed in World War I. He became severely ill in 1912 and an operation in 1914 left him paralysed in the lower limbs and caused his retirement. Despite this, he retained the wit and charm he was known for. After retiring, Trouton lived in Tilford, Surrey, and then Downe in Kent where he died on 21 September 1922.
