= Georges Sagnac =

French physicist

- Born: 14 October 1869; Périgueux, France
- Died: 26 February 1928 (aged 58)
- Known for: Sagnac effect X-ray fluorescence
- Scientific career
- Fields: Optics
- Workplaces: University of Sorbonne

Georges Sagnac (French pronunciation: [ʒɔʁʒ saɲak]; 14 October 1869 – 26 February 1928) was a French physicist who lent his name to the Sagnac effect, a phenomenon which is at the basis of interferometers and ring laser gyroscopes developed since the 1970s.

== Life and work ==
Sagnac was born at Périgueux and entered the École Normale Supérieure in 1889. While a lab assistant at the Sorbonne, he was one of the first in France to study X-rays, following Wilhelm Conrad Röntgen. He belonged to a group of friends and scientists that notably included Pierre Curie and Marie Skłodowska-Curie, Paul Langevin, Jean Perrin, and the mathematician Émile Borel. Marie Skłodowska-Curie says that she and her husband had traded ideas with Sagnac around the time of the discovery of radioactivity. Sagnac died at Meudon-Bellevue.

== Sagnac effect ==
In 1913, Georges Sagnac showed that if a beam of light is split and sent in two opposite directions around a closed path on a revolving platform with mirrors on its perimeter, and then the beams are recombined, they will exhibit interference effects. From this result Sagnac concluded that light propagates at a speed independent of the speed of the source. The motion of the earth through space had no apparent effect on the speed of the light beam, no matter how the platform was turned. The effect had been observed earlier (by Harress in 1911), but Sagnac was the first to correctly identify the cause.

This Sagnac effect (in vacuum) had been theoretically predicted by Max von Laue in 1911. He showed that such an effect is consistent with stationary ether theories (such as the Lorentz ether theory) as well as with Einstein's theory of relativity. It is generally taken to be inconsistent with a complete ether drag; and also inconsistent with emission theories of light, according to which the speed of light depends on the speed of the source.

Sagnac was a staunch opponent of the theory of relativity, despite the Sagnac effect being consistent with it.

== See also ==
- Sagnac effect
- History of special relativity#Experiments by Fizeau and Sagnac
