= Trouton–Rankine experiment =

The Trouton–Rankine experiment was an experiment designed to measure if the Lorentz–FitzGerald contraction of an object according to one frame (as defined by the luminiferous aether) produced a measurable effect in the rest frame of the object, so that the ether would act as a "preferred frame". The experiment was first performed by Frederick Thomas Trouton and Alexander Oliver Rankine in 1908.

The outcome of the experiment was negative, which is in agreement with the principle of relativity (and thus special relativity as well), according to which observers at rest in a certain inertial reference frame, cannot measure their own translational motion by instruments at rest in the same frame. Consequently, also length contraction cannot be measured by co-moving observers. See also Tests of special relativity.

== Description ==
The famous Michelson–Morley experiment of 1887 showed that the then-accepted aether theory needed to be modified. FitzGerald and Lorentz, independently of each other, proposed a length contraction of the experimental apparatus in the direction of motion (with respect to the luminiferous aether) that would explain the almost null result of the Michelson–Morley experiment. The first attempts to measure some consequences of this contraction in the lab frame (the inertial frame of reference of an observer co-moving with the experimental apparatus) were made in the Experiments of Rayleigh and Brace (1902, 1904), though the result was negative. By 1908, however, the then-current theories of electrodynamics, Lorentz ether theory (now superseded) and special relativity (now generally accepted, and lacking any aether at all), predicted that the Lorentz–FitzGerald contraction is not measurable in a co-moving frame, because these theories were based on the Lorentz transformation.

In the Trouton–Rankine experiment, it was expected that length changes due to Lorentz–FitzGerald contraction would result in detectable changes in the measured voltage across a Wheatstone bridge as the circuit is rotated.

Frederick Thomas Trouton, (after conducting the Trouton–Noble experiment in 1903), instead did the calculations using his own interpretation of electrodynamics, calculating the length contraction according to the velocity of the experimental apparatus in the aether frame, but calculating the electrodynamics by applying Maxwell's equations and Ohm's law in the lab frame. According to Trouton's view of electrodynamics, the calculations then predicted a measurable effect of the length contraction in the lab frame. Together with Alexander Oliver Rankine, he set out to verify this in 1908 by attempting to measure the change of the resistance of a coil as it changed its orientation to the "aether velocity" (the velocity of the lab through the luminiferous aether). This was done by putting four identical coils in a Wheatstone bridge configuration which allowed them to precisely measure any change in resistance. The circuit was then rotated 90 degrees about its axis as the resistance was measured. Because the Lorentz–FitzGerald contraction is only in the direction of motion, from the point of view of the "Aether frame" the length of the coils depended on their angle with respect to their Aether velocity. Trouton and Rankine therefore believed that the resistance as measured in the rest frame of the experiment should change as the device was rotated. However their careful measurements showed no detectable change in resistance.

This showed that if the Lorentz–FitzGerald contraction existed, it was not measurable in the rest frame of the object – only theories containing the complete Lorentz transformation, like special relativity, are still valid.

== See also ==
- History of special relativity
