= Robert S. Shankland =

American physicist and historian

- Shankland c. 1969
- Born: Robert Sherwood Shankland; January 11, 1908; Willoughby, Ohio, US
- Died: March 1, 1982 (aged 74); Cleveland, Ohio, US
- Education: Case School for Applied Sciences; University of Chicago
- Known for: Compton scattering History of modern physics
- Spouses: Hilda Catherine Kinneson (m. 1929; died 1970) Eleanor Newlin (m. 1970)
- Children: 5
- Scientific career
- Fields: Physicist
- Doctoral advisor: Arthur Compton

Robert Sherwood Shankland (January 11, 1908 – March 1, 1982) was an American physicist and historian.

== Biography ==
Robert S. Shankland was an undergraduate at the Case School for Applied Sciences from 1925–1929 and received his master's degree in 1933. He completed his Ph.D. degree in 1935 for work on photon scattering with Arthur Compton at the University of Chicago. His other research included work on the ionosphere and standard frequency regulations from 1929–1930 with the US National Bureau of Standards, and worked in England on sonar for submarine warfare early in World War II.

Shankland's report on the Albert A. Michelson's Irvine Ranch experiments was published in 1953. In the British journal Nature, Shankland gave the historical background of how Einstein formulates the first two principles, in 1905, of the special theory of relativity from the Michelson–Morley experiment. Shankland believed that the accepted direct explanation for the Michelson–Morley experiment is provided by the special theory of relativity given by Einstein in 1905. Shankland recorded that Michelson's Santa Ana trip was to look at the science of the aether.

After completing graduate studies he joined the faculty at Case School for Applied Sciences. In 1941 he succeeded Dayton C. Miller as the Ambrose Swasey Professor of Physics at Case, a position he held until his retirement in 1976. Shankland worked on neutrino experiments with Argonne National Laboratory from 1953–1969, and had other interests including the history of relativity and architectural acoustics. He collaborated with George Szell, the director of the Cleveland Orchestra, to improve the acoustics of Severance Hall, making it easier for musicians to hear each other on the stage.

Shankland's father, Frank North Shankland, was the author of "Modern Romances" and several books on birds and animals. In 1929 Shankland married Hilda Catherine Kinneson. They had five children: Ruth Ellen, Dorothy Margaret, Lois Virginia, Ava Gertrude, and Sherwood Jean, and 14 grandchildren. Hilda died in 1970 and he married Eleanor Newlin. Shankland was a passionate outdoorsman and a knowledgeable collector of iron animal traps and Native American artifacts.

== Analysis of the Miller experiment ==
Beginning in 1952, Shankland led a team that performed an analysis of Dayton Miller's interferometric results, and concluded that Miller's reported positive ether drift was likely caused by thermal fluctuations, and that, when this is taken into account, the results were consistent with special relativity. Shankland's explanation is now accepted by most mainstream scientists.

In 1925–1926, Dayton Miller performed interferometric observations at Mount Wilson, similar to the Michelson–Morley experiment, that appeared to reflect a measurable drift of the Earth through the luminiferous aether, in apparent contradiction with other experiments of that type and with relativity's prediction that no aether should be observable.

In 1955, Shankland published a paper analyzing Miller's data, arguing that "the small periodic fringe displacements found by Miller are due in part to statistical fluctuations in the readings of the fringe positions in a very difficult experiment" and "the remaining systematic effects are ascribed to local temperature conditions." Moreover, he argues that the thermal gradients responsible for the effects "were much more troublesome at Mount Wilson than those encountered by experimenters elsewhere, including Miller himself in his work done at Case in Cleveland." In a 1973 review paper on the experimental development of relativity, Shankland included an August 31, 1954 letter to him by Einstein agreeing with his analysis. (Shankland had sent Einstein a manuscript prior to its publication.) Einstein wrote:

I thank you very much for sending me your careful study about the Miller experiments. Those experiments, conducted with so much care, merit, of course, a very careful statistical investigation. This is more so as the existence of a not trivial positive effect would affect very deeply the fundament of theoretical physics as it is presently accepted.
You have shown convincingly that the observed effect is outside the range of accidental deviations and must, therefore, have a systematic cause. You made it quite probable that this systematic cause has nothing to do with "ether-wind," but has to do with differences of temperature of the air traversed by the two light bundles which produced the bands of interference. Such an effect is indeed practically inevitable if the walls of the laboratory room have a not negligible difference in temperature.
It is one of the cases where the systematic errors are increasing quickly with the dimension of the apparatus.

In Shankland's re-analysis, no statistically significant signal for the existence of aether was found. The analysis is accepted by mainstream physicists, the abandonment of the concept of the aether is nearly universal, and Miller's observed signal is believed the result of experimenter's bias; the "signal" that Miller observed in 1933 is actually composed of points that are an average of several hundred measurements each, and the magnitude of the signal is more than 10 times smaller than the resolution with which the measurements were recorded.

Though Maurice Allais and James DeMeo do not accept Shankland's refutation and hold to the belief that Miller's experiment invalidates the theory of relativity, Einstein's theory is today regarded by most physicists as proven, based largely on the vastly more accurate repetitions of Miller's measurements made using modern optical technology by numerous independent researchers that have shown conclusively that Miller's reported positive signal was spurious. Miller's data, and Shankland's analysis of it, are now of only historical interest.

== External links and references ==
- AIP International Catalog of Sources, summary of Robert S. Shankland audio archive.
- James DeMeo, "Dayton Miller's Ether-Drift Experiments: A Fresh Look"
- Allais, Maurice, "The experiments of Dayton C. Miller (1925–1926) and the Theory of Relativity". 21st century – Science & Technology. Spring 1998.
  - "The experiments by Dayton C Miller (1925–1926) and relativity theory". (German)
- Allais, Maurice, "Very significant regularities in the interferometric observations of Dayton C. Miller 1925–1926". French Academy of Sciences, January 23, 1997.
- Allais, Maurice, "New very significant regularities in the interferometric observations of Dayton C. Miller 1925–1926". French Academy of Sciences, April 26, 1999.
- Allais, Maurice, "The origin of the very significant regularities displayed in the interferometric observations of Dayton C. Miller 1925–1926: temperatures effects or space anisotropy?". French Academy of Sciences, December 2000
- "The Effect of solar motion upon the fringe-shifts in a Michelson-Morley interferometer a la Miller". Annales de la Fondation Louis de Broglie, Volume 27 no 3, 2002 463. (PDF)
- "The Michelson Speed of Light Experiment at the Irvine Ranch"
- Time and Eternity – Chapter1
- R. S. Shankland, S. W. McCuskey, F. C. Leone, and G. Kuerti, "New analysis of the interferometric observations of Dayton C. Miller," Rev. Mod. Phys. 27, 167–178 (1955).
- R. S. Shankland, "Michelson's role in the development of relativity," Applied Optics 12 (10), 2280 (1973).

== Appendix: partial list of Shankland's publications ==
- R. S. Shankland, "An apparent failure of the photon theory of scattering," Phys. Rev. 49, 8–13 (1936).
- R. S. Shankland, J. W. Coltman, "Departure of overtones of vibrating wire from true harmonic series," J. Acoust. Soc. Am. 10 (3), 161–166 (1939).
- R. S. Shankland, "Analysis of pulses by means of harmonic analyzer," J. Acoust. Soc. Am. 12 (3), 383–386 (1941).
- E. W. Samuel, R. S. Shankland, "Sound field of Straubel X-cut crystal," J. Acoust. Soc. Am. 22 (5), 589–592 (1950).
- R. S. Shankland, S. W. McCuskey, F. C. Leone, and G. Kuerti, "New analysis of the interferometric observations of Dayton C. Miller," Rev. Mod. Phys. 27, 167–178 (1955).
- H. J. Ormestad, R. S. Shankland, A. H. Benade, "Reverberation time characteristics of Severance Hall," J. Acoust. Soc. Am. 32 (3), 371–375 (1960).
- R. S. Shankland, Atomic and Nuclear Physics (Macmillan: New York, 1960).
- R. S. Shankland, "Michelson-Morley experiment," Am. J. Phys. 32 (1), 16–35 (1964).
- R. S. Shankland, "Quality of reverberation," J. Acoust. Soc. Am. 43 (3), 426–430 (1968).
- R. S. Shankland, ed., Scientific Papers of Arthur Holly Compton, (University of Chicago Press: Chicago, 1973).
- R. S. Shankland, "Michelson's role in the development of relativity," Applied Optics 12 (10), 2280 (1973).
- R. S. Shankland, "Conversations with Einstein," American Journal of Physics 41 (7), 895–901 (1973).
- R. S. Shankland, "Acoustics of Greek theaters," Physics Today 26 (10), 30 (1973).
- R. S. Shankland, "Michelson and his interferometer," Physics Today 27 (4), 37 (1974)
- R. S. Shankland, "Michelson: America's first Nobel-prize winner in science," Bulletin of the American Physical Society 21 (4), 601–602 (1976).
- R. S. Shankland, "Architectural Acoustics in America to 1930," J. Acoust. Soc. Am. 61 (2), 250–254 (1977).
- R. S. Shankland, "Acoustical designing for performers," J. Acoust. Soc. Am. 65 (1), 140–144 (1979).
- R. S. Shankland, "Einstein, Albert — In Remembrance," Biography — An Interdisciplinary Quarterly 2 (3), 190–200 (1979)
