= Terrell rotation =

Effect in special relativity

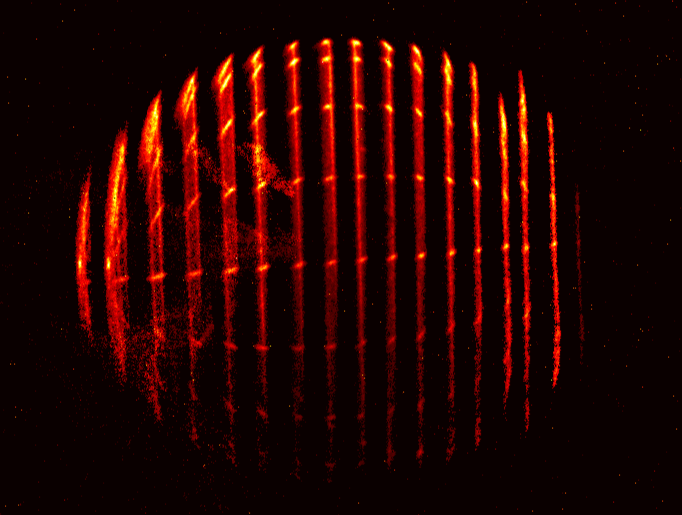
Experimental visualization of the Terrell effect using femtosecond pulse shaping and a gated intensified camera.

Terrell rotation or the Terrell effect is the visual distortion that a passing object would appear to undergo, according to the special theory of relativity, if it were travelling at a significant fraction of the speed of light. This behaviour was first discussed by Austrian physicist Anton Lampa in 1924, and further developed independently by both Roger Penrose and James Terrell in 1959. Due to an early dispute about priority and correct attribution, the effect is also sometimes referred to as the Penrose–Terrell effect, the Terrell–Penrose effect or the Lampa–Terrell–Penrose effect.

== History ==
In 1924, Anton Lampa pointed out that the visual length of a moving one-dimensional rod does not appear Lorentz contracted due to optical time-of-flight effects, yet his paper was overlooked for a long time. This result was rediscovered and extended to three-dimensional objects by Penrose and Terrell, who particularly pointed out that 3D objects also appear to be rotated. Roger Penrose's article on the effect was submitted 29 July 1958 and published in January 1959. James Terrell's article was submitted 22 June 1959 and published 15 November 1959. Penrose specifically developed the case of a sphere.

Terrell's and Penrose's papers prompted a number of follow-up papers, mostly in the American Journal of Physics, exploring the consequences of this correction. These papers pointed out that some existing discussions of special relativity were flawed and "explained" effects that the theory did not actually predict – while these papers did not change the actual mathematical structure of special relativity in any way, they did correct a misconception regarding the theory's predictions.

This phenomenon was popularized by Victor Weisskopf in a Physics Today article in 1960.

In 2017, astronomer Avi Loeb suggested that the Terrell effect could have applications for measuring exoplanet masses.

The effect was experimentally demonstrated in 2024 by Peter Schattschneider and his group of TU Wien. They used coordinated laser pulses and cameras to reduce the apparent speed of light to 2 m/s, making the effect visible.

In the lead illustration, an oblate spheroid representing a Lorentz-contracted sphere traveling at 0.999 c is oriented with its north pole aimed directly towards the camera. This spheroid is moved from right-to-left and illuminated with successive femtosecond light flashes. Only light arriving at the camera within fixed 300 picosecond gating times are recorded. By combining images, the Terrell-rotated appearance of a sphere traveling at 0.999 c to the left could be simulated. In the lead image, the north pole of the sphere appears rotated towards the leftmost rim, and the outline of the sphere is nearly circular.

== Description ==
By symmetry, it is equivalent to the visual appearance of the object at rest as seen by a moving observer. Since Lorentz transformations do not depend on the acceleration, the visual appearance of the object depends only on the instantaneous velocity, and not the acceleration of the observer.

Comparison of the measured length contraction of a cube moving left to right versus its visual appearance. The view is from the front of the cube at a distance four times the length of the cube's sides, three-quarters of the way from bottom to top, as projected onto a vertical screen (so that the vertical lines of the cube may initially be parallel).

Terrell's and Penrose's papers pointed out that although special relativity appeared to describe an "observed contraction" in moving objects, these interpreted "observations" were not to be confused with the theory's literal predictions for the visible appearance of a moving object. Thanks to the differential timelag effects in signals reaching the observer from the object's different parts, a receding object would appear contracted, an approaching object would appear elongated (even under special relativity) and the geometry of a passing object would appear skewed, as if rotated. By Penrose: "the light from the trailing part reaches the observer from behind the sphere, which it can do since the sphere is continuously moving out of its way".

A globe, moving at various speeds to the right, is observed from three diameters distance from its nearest point on the surface (marked by a red cross). The left image shows the globe's measured, Lorentz-contracted shape. The right image shows the visual appearance of the globe.

For images of passing objects, the apparent contraction of distances between points on the object's transverse surface could then be interpreted as being due to an apparent change in viewing angle, and the image of the object could be interpreted as appearing instead to be rotated. A previously popular description of special relativity's predictions, in which an observer sees a passing object to be contracted (for instance, from a sphere to a flattened ellipsoid), was wrong. A sphere maintains its circular outline since, as the sphere moves, light from further points of the Lorentz-contracted ellipsoid takes longer to reach the eye.

Terrell rotation of an approaching and receding cube

== In educational games ==
A representation of the Terrell effect can be seen in the physics simulator A Slower Speed of Light, published by the Massachusetts Institute of Technology (MIT).

== See also ==
- Length contraction
- Stellar aberration
