= Martin Hoek =

Dutch astronomer and experimental physicist (1834–1873)

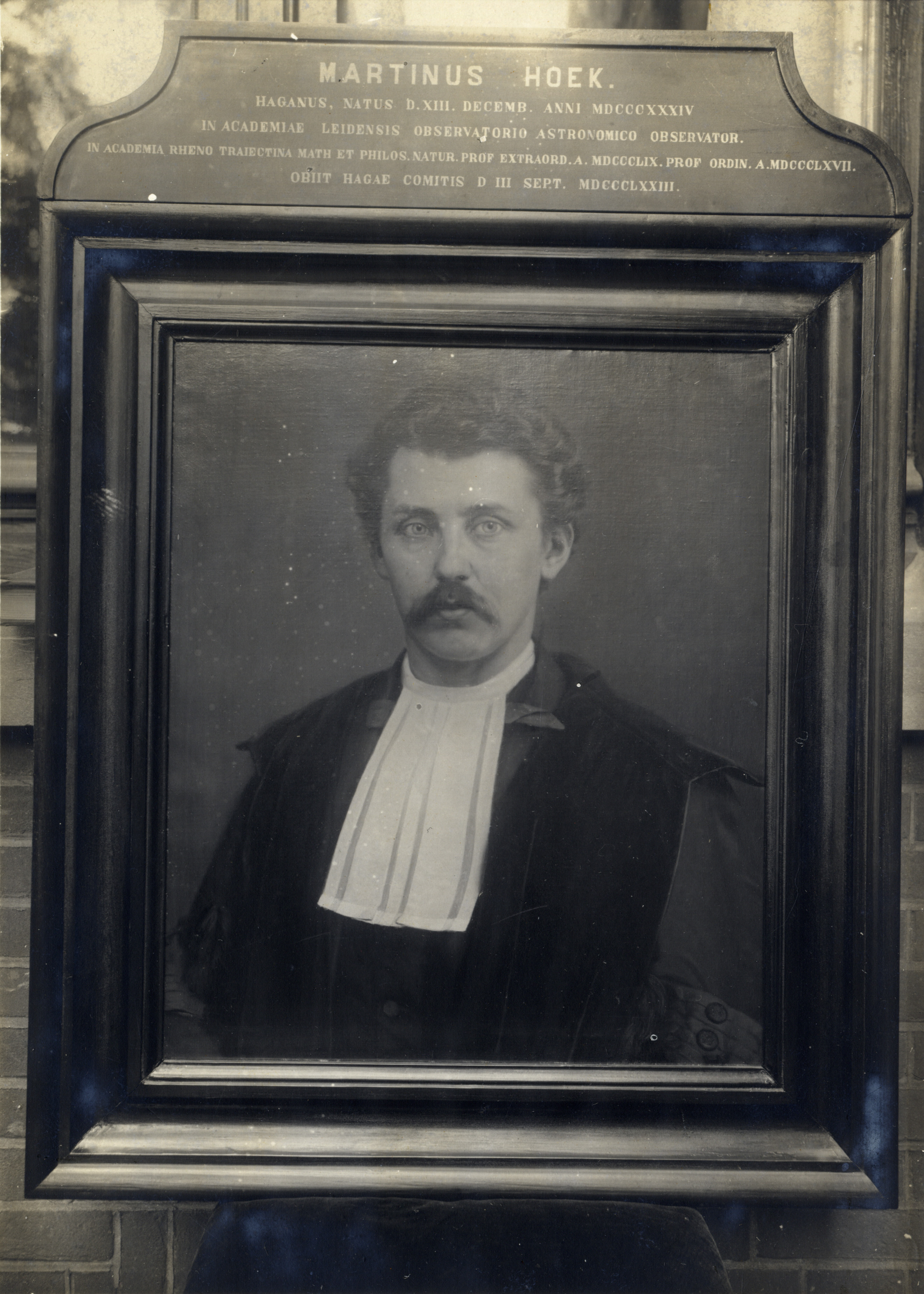

Martin Hoek (also Martinus) (13 December 1834 in The Hague – 3 September 1873 in Utrecht) was a Dutch astronomer and experimental physicist.

== Education and career ==
He started studying medicine in 1852, but spent his last two years at the University of Leiden in mathematics and physics studying under Frederik Kaiser. In 1857 he graduated with the Ph.D. dissertation work The comet of the years 1556, 1264 and 975, and its alleged identity.

Donati's comet (now officially designated C/1858 L1 and 1858 VI), the second most brilliant comet of the 19th century, had been considered to be a return of the comets of 1556, 1264, and 975. Earlier, in 1856, Karl Ludwig von Littrow had discovered at the Vienna State Archives a pamphlet by Joachim Heller containing observations of the Great Comet of 1556 as well as a broadsheet by Paul Fabricius with a map of the comet's course. Using Littrow's discovered materials, Hoek proved conclusively that the comets of 1264 and 1556 were not identical, and that Donati's comet did not therefore represent their reappearance.

In 1859 he was associate professor of astronomy at the University of Utrecht and Director of the Royal Observatory Sonnenborgh. In collaboration with Anthonie Cornelis Oudemans, he wrote Recherches de la d'quantite ether contenue dans les Liquids (Research of the amount of aether contained in liquids) (1864) and Sur les contractions dans les Melanges de Liquids (On contractions in mixtures of liquids).

In 1864 he became member of the Royal Netherlands Academy of Arts and Sciences.

In 1868 he performed a modified version of the Fizeau experiment.
