= DeWitt Bristol Brace =

American physicist (1859–1905)

DeWitt Bristol Brace (January 5, 1859 – October 2, 1905) was an American physicist who was known for his optical experiments, especially as regards the relative motion of Earth and the luminiferous aether.

== Life and work ==
Brace was born in Wilson, New York, prepared for his studies in Lockport and graduated in 1881 at the Boston University. Afterwards he spent two years at the Johns Hopkins University with Henry Augustus Rowland, and two years at the University of Berlin under Hermann von Helmholtz and Gustav Kirchhoff, where he graduated in 1885. From 1887 to 1888 he was assistant professor at the University of Michigan and from 1888 to 1905 Professor of Physics at the University of Nebraska–Lincoln. There, Brace founded the Physics Laboratory, but he fell ill in 1905 and died at the time of opening of the new laboratory that still bears his name.

Brace was mainly concerned with researches on optics. For example, he invented new types of polarizing filters. He carried out a series of experiments which should determine the state of motion of the earth in the ether ("ether drift"), but the results were all negative. Particularly important was the improved version of an experiment by Lord Rayleigh, where he demonstrated with great accuracy that the Lorentz contraction does not lead to birefringence. He also attempted to measure the speed of light with great precision, but he died in the midst of his work.

Brace was a fellow and vice president of the American Association for the Advancement of Science, and member of the Council of the American Physical Society.

== See also ==
- Experiments of Rayleigh and Brace

== Publications ==
- On Double Refraction in Matter moving through the Aether (Philosophical Magazine, S. 6., Vol. 7, No. 40., April 1904, pp. 317–329)
- The Ether and moving Matter (Congress of arts and science, universal exposition, St. Louis 1904, (1906), vol. 4, pp. 105–117)
- The Negative Results of Second and Third Order Tests of the "Aether Drift," and Possible First Order Methods (Philosophical Magazine (1905), vol. 10, pp. 71–80)
- The Aether "Drift" and Rotary Polarization. (Phil. Mag., London, (Ser. 6), 10, 1905, pp. 383–396)
- A Repetition of Fizeau's Experiment on the Change produced by the Earth's Motion on the Rotation of a Refracted Ray (Phil. Mag., London, (Ser. 6), 10, 1905, pp. 591–599)
