= Index of physics articles (T) =

The index of physics articles is split into multiple pages due to its size.

To navigate by individual letter use the table of contents below.

== T ==
- Τ–θ puzzle
- T-15 (reactor)
- T-J model
- T-duality
- T-symmetry
- T. H. Laby
- T. Neil Davis
- T. V. Ramakrishnan
- T2K experiment
- TAMA 300
- TASSO
- TEA laser
- Terahertz radiation
- TINKER
- TORRO scale
- TOTEM
- TRACER (cosmic ray detector)
- TRIGA
- Troitsk Institute of Innovative and Thermonuclear Research
- TRIUMF
- T meson
- Ta-You Wu
- Table of nuclides
- Table of radioactive decay
- Table of thermodynamic equations
- Tachyon
- Tachyon condensation
- Tachyonic antitelephone
- Tachyonic field
- Tacoma Narrows Bridge (1940)
- Tadeusz Banachiewicz
- Tadpole (physics)
- Tai Tsun Wu
- Tailless aircraft
- Tailwind
- Tait equation
- Takahiko Yamanouchi
- Takens' theorem
- Taketani Mitsuo
- Taksu Cheon
- Talbot cavity
- Tamiaki Yoneya
- Tandem Accelerator Superconducting Cyclotron
- Tandem Van de Graaff
- Tangent modulus
- Tangent stiffness matrix
- Tangloids
- Tanjore Ramachandra Anantharaman
- Tanya Atwater
- Target strength
- Tatyana Sapunova
- Tau (particle)
- Tau neutrino
- Taub-NUT vacuum
- Tauonium
- Taylor column
- Taylor cone
- Taylor dispersion
- Taylor microscale
- Taylor number
- Taylor state
- Taylor vortex
- Taylor–Couette flow
- Taylor–Goldstein equation
- Taylor–Green vortex
- Taylor–Proudman theorem
- Tea leaf paradox
- Tears of wine
- Technetium-99m
- Technetium-99m generator
- Technical atmosphere
- Technical report
- Technicolor (physics)
- Technological applications of superconductivity
- Tecplot
- Tectonophysics
- Tectonophysics (journal)
- Ted Jacobson
- Ted Taylor (physicist)
- Tekin Dereli
- Teleforce
- Telegeodynamics
- Teleidoscope
- Teleparallelism
- Telescope
- Telescope Array Project
- Telescoping (mechanics)
- Telluric current
- Teltron tube
- Temistocle Calzecchi-Onesti
- Temperature
- Temperature coefficient
- Temperature control
- Temperature dependence of liquid viscosity
- Temperature measurement
- Temperature–entropy diagram
- Temporal paradox
- Tendex line
- Tennis racket theorem
- Tensile stress
- Tensiometer (surface tension)
- Tension (physics)
- Tensometer
- Tensor
- Tensor calculus
- Tensor density
- Tensor field
- Tensors in curvilinear coordinates
- Tensor–vector–scalar gravity
- Tephigram
- Terahertz band
- Terahertz metamaterials
- Terahertz radiation
- Terahertz spectroscopy
- Terence Quinn
- Term symbol
- Terminal velocity
- Termination shock
- Terminator (solar)
- Terrell rotation
- Terrella
- Terrestrial Physics
- Terrestrial gamma-ray flash
- Terrestrial reference frame
- Terrestrial stationary waves
- Tesla (unit)
- Tesla coil
- Tesla turbine
- Tessaleno Devezas
- Test charge
- Test particle
- Test theories of special relativity
- Tests of electromagnetism
- Tests of general relativity
- Tests of relativistic energy and momentum
- Tests of special relativity
- Tetrad formalism
- Tetrads in general relativity
- Tetragonal crystal system
- Tetraneutron
- Tetraquark
- Tevatron
- Tevian Dray
- Textile-reinforced materials
- Texture (cosmology)
- Texture (crystalline)
- Thales
- Thanu Padmanabhan
- The Astronomy and Astrophysics Review
- The Astrophysical Journal
- The Beginning of Infinity
- The Black Hole War
- The Character of Physical Law
- The Continuing Revolution
- The Cosmic Landscape
- The Dancing Wu Li Masters
- The Electrician
- The Elegant Universe
- The Emperor's New Mind
- The End of Time (book)
- The Evolution of Physics
- The Fabric of Reality
- The Fabric of the Cosmos
- The Feynman Lectures on Physics
- The First Three Minutes: A Modern View of the Origin of the Universe
- The Fly in the Cathedral
- The Flying Circus of Physics
- The God Particle: If the Universe Is the Answer, What Is the Question?
- The Grand Design (book)
- The Hidden Reality: Parallel Universes and the Deep Laws of the Cosmos
- The Hubble Limit
- The Hum
- The Internet Pilot to Physics
- The Journal of Lightwave Technology
- The Large, the Small and the Human Mind
- The Large Scale Structure of Space-Time
- The Laws of Physics
- The Left Hand of the Electron
- The Meaning of It All
- The Monkey and the Hunter
- The Nature of Space and Time
- The Physicists
- The Physics Teacher
- The Physics of Basketball
- The Physics of Blown Sand and Desert Dunes
- The Physics of Star Trek
- The Physics of Superheroes
- The Quantum Universe
- The Radiation Belt and Magnetosphere
- The Road to Reality
- The Strangest Man
- The Tao of Physics
- The Trouble with Physics
- The Universe in a Nutshell
- The Unreasonable Effectiveness of Mathematics in the Natural Sciences
- The Value of Science
- The Wigner Medal
- The World (Descartes)
- The World as I See It (book)
- The gadget
- Theo Geisel (physicist)
- Theodor Kaluza
- Theodor Rehbock
- Theodor W. Hänsch
- Theodor Wulf
- Theodore Lyman
- Theodore Maiman
- Theodore Postol
- Theodore Theodorsen
- Theodore William Richards
- Theodore Y. Wu
- Theodore von Kármán
- Theodoric of Freiberg
- Theophrastus
- Theorem of corresponding states
- Theoretical Advanced Study Institute
- Theoretical and Mathematical Physics
- Theoretical astrophysics
- Theoretical gravity
- Theoretical motivation for general relativity
- Theoretical physics
- Theoretical planetology
- Theories of cloaking
- Theory and Phenomena of Metamaterials
- Theory of Colours
- Theory of everything
- Theory of heat
- Theory of relativity
- Theory of tides
- There's Plenty of Room at the Bottom
- Thermal
- Thermal Hall effect
- Thermal airship
- Thermal analysis
- Thermal bar
- Thermal bath (thermodynamics)
- Thermal blooming
- Thermal conductance quantum
- Thermal conduction
- Thermal conductivity
- Thermal contact
- Thermal contact conductance
- Thermal de Broglie wavelength
- Thermal diffusivity
- Thermal diode
- Thermal effective mass
- Thermal efficiency
- Thermal energy
- Thermal energy storage
- Thermal expansion
- Thermal fluctuations
- Thermal fluids
- Thermal flywheel effect
- Thermal hydraulics
- Thermal inertia
- Thermal insulation
- Thermal ionization
- Thermal ionization mass spectrometry
- Thermal laser stimulation
- Thermal light
- Thermal loop
- Thermal mass
- Thermal motion
- Thermal quantum field theory
- Thermal radiation
- Thermal reservoir
- Thermal resistance
- Thermal science
- Thermal simulations for Integrated Circuits
- Thermal transmittance
- Thermal transport in nanostructures
- Thermal velocity
- Thermalisation
- Thermally stimulated current spectroscopy
- Thermionic emission
- Thermionics
- Thermistor
- Thermo-dielectric effect
- Thermo-migration
- Thermoacoustic heat engine
- Thermoacoustics
- Thermochromism
- Thermocouple
- Thermodynamic beta
- Thermodynamic cycle
- Thermodynamic diagrams
- Thermodynamic efficiency
- Thermodynamic equations
- Thermodynamic equilibrium
- Thermodynamic free energy
- Thermodynamic instruments
- Thermodynamic length
- Thermodynamic limit
- Thermodynamic potential
- Thermodynamic process
- Thermodynamic pump testing
- Thermodynamic square
- Thermodynamic state
- Thermodynamic system
- Thermodynamic temperature
- Thermodynamic variable
- Thermodynamicist
- Thermodynamics
- Thermoeconomics
- Thermoelectric cooling
- Thermoelectric effect
- Thermoelectric materials
- Thermography
- Thermogravimetric analysis
- Thermoluminescence
- Thermoluminescent Dosimeter
- Thermomagnetic convection
- Thermomechanical analysis
- Thermometer
- Thermomigration
- Thermonuclear weapon
- Thermophoresis
- Thermophotonics
- Thermophotovoltaic
- Thermoporometry and cryoporometry
- Thermoremanence
- Thermoremanent magnetization
- Thermosiphon
- Thermotropic crystal
- Thermotunnel cooling
- Theta meson
- Theta vacuum
- Thibault Damour
- Thin-film bulk acoustic resonator
- Thin-film interference
- Thin-film optics
- Thin Man (nuclear bomb)
- Thin Solid Films
- Thin lens
- Third Cambridge Catalogue of Radio Sources
- Third law of thermodynamics
- Thirring model
- Thirring–Wess model
- Thixotropy
- Thomas-François Dalibard
- Thomas Allibone
- Thomas Bradwardine
- Thomas C. Hanks
- Thomas Chrowder Chamberlin
- Thomas Corwin Mendenhall
- Thomas Curtright
- Thomas Dale Stewart
- Thomas Dale Stewart (physicist)
- Thomas Ebbesen
- Thomas Eckersley
- Thomas Eugene Everhart
- Thomas F Krauss
- Thomas Fincke
- Thomas G. Barnes
- Thomas Godfrey (inventor)
- Thomas Gold
- Thomas Grubb
- Thomas Guidott
- Thomas H. Stix
- Thomas J. Ahrens
- Thomas J. Bowles (physicist)
- Thomas J. Parmley
- Thomas Jefferson National Accelerator Facility
- Thomas Johann Seebeck
- Thomas M. Baer
- Thomas Parnell (scientist)
- Thomas Preston (scientist)
- Thomas Ralph Merton
- Thomas Rockwell Mackie
- Thomas S. Lundgren
- Thomas Spencer (mathematical physicist)
- Thomas T. Goldsmith, Jr.
- Thomas Timusk
- Thomas Townsend Brown
- Thomas Young (scientist)
- Thomas Ypsilantis
- Thomas precession
- Thomas–Fermi model
- Thomson (unit)
- Thomson Experiment
- Thomson Reuters Citation Laureates
- Thomson problem
- Thomson scattering
- Thor Rhodin
- Thorne–Hawking–Preskill bet
- Thorne–Żytkow object
- Thouless energy
- Three-body force
- Three-phase
- Three Roads to Quantum Gravity
- Three jet event
- Threshold energy
- Throttling process
- Throttling process (thermodynamics)
- Thrust
- Thrust reversal
- Thunder
- Théophile de Donder
- Thévenin's theorem
- Ti-sapphire laser
- Tiberius Cavallo
- Tidal acceleration
- Tidal atlas
- Tidal bore
- Tidal diamond
- Tidal force
- Tidal power
- Tidal race
- Tidal range
- Tidal resonance
- Tidal tensor
- Tide
- Tide table
- Tideline
- Tight binding
- Tihomir Novakov
- Tilt (optics)
- Tim Pedley
- Timaeus (dialogue)
- Time
- Time-dependent density functional theory
- Time-evolving block decimation
- Time constant
- Time derivative
- Time dilation
- Time evolution
- Time evolution of integrals
- Time in physics
- Time loop
- Time of flight
- Time of flight detector
- Time projection chamber
- Time stream
- Time travel
- Timelike congruence
- Timelike homotopy
- Timelike simply connected
- Timeline of Solar System astronomy
- Timeline of astronomical maps, catalogs, and surveys
- Timeline of atomic and subatomic physics
- Timeline of black hole physics
- Timeline of carbon nanotubes
- Timeline of chemical elements discoveries
- Timeline of classical mechanics
- Timeline of cosmic microwave background astronomy
- Timeline of cosmological theories
- Timeline of discovery of Solar System planets and their moons
- Timeline of electromagnetic theory
- Timeline of electromagnetism and classical optics
- Timeline of fundamental physics discoveries
- Timeline of gravitational physics and relativity
- Timeline of knowledge about galaxies, clusters of galaxies, and large-scale structure
- Timeline of luminiferous aether
- Timeline of nuclear fusion
- Timeline of particle discoveries
- Timeline of particle physics
- Timeline of particle physics technology
- Timeline of quantum mechanics
- Timeline of states of matter and phase transitions
- Timeline of temperature and pressure measurement technology
- Timeline of the Manhattan Project
- Timeline of the far future
- Timeline of thermodynamics
- Timoshenko Medal
- Timothy Hampton
- Timothy Schrabback
- Tim Sumner (physicist)
- Tingye Li
- Tiny ionospheric photometer
- Tipler cylinder
- Tippe top
- Tipping point (physics)
- Tired light
- ToFeT
- Tod R. Lauer
- Toda field theory
- Tokamak
- Tokamak Fusion Test Reactor
- Tokamak de Fontenay aux Roses
- Tokamak à configuration variable
- Tollmien–Schlichting wave
- Tolman length
- Tolman–Oppenheimer–Volkoff equation
- Tolman–Oppenheimer–Volkoff limit
- Tom Abel (cosmologist)
- Tom Baehr-Jones
- Tom Banks (physicist)
- Tom Lubensky
- Tom W. B. Kibble
- Tom W. Bonner Prize in Nuclear Physics
- Tomalla Foundation
- Tomlinson model
- Tomographic reconstruction
- Tomography
- Tone hole
- Tonks–Girardeau gas
- Tonpilz
- Tony Hey
- Tony Skyrme
- Top Lambda baryon
- Top eta meson
- Top quark
- Top quark condensate
- Topcolor
- Topness
- Topogravitic tensor
- Topological censorship
- Topological conjugacy
- Topological defect
- Topological degeneracy
- Topological entropy
- Topological entropy in physics
- Topological order
- Topological quantum computer
- Topological quantum number
- Topological string theory
- Toponium
- Tor Hagfors
- Torahiko Terada
- Torbjørn Digernes
- Tore Supra
- Toric lens
- Tornado
- Toroidal reflector
- Toroidal ring model
- Torque
- Torque density
- Torricelli's equation
- Torricelli's law
- Torsion (mechanics)
- Torsion coefficient
- Torsion field (pseudoscience)
- Torsion spring
- Toshihide Maskawa
- Total air temperature
- Total angular momentum quantum number
- Total derivative
- Total dynamic head
- Total effective dose equivalent
- Total external reflection
- Total internal reflection
- Total internal reflection fluorescence microscope
- Total pressure
- Total refraction
- Total variation diminishing
- Totalitarian principle
- Toughness
- Townsend (unit)
- Townsend coefficient
- Toy model
- Trace-free Ricci tensor
- Trace distance
- Track Imaging Cherenkov Experiment
- Tracking (particle physics)
- Tracy Hall
- Trailing edge
- Train noise
- Trajectory
- Trajectory optimization
- Trans-Planckian problem
- Transactional interpretation
- Transduction (biophysics)
- Transfer-matrix method
- Transfer-matrix method (optics)
- Transfer operator
- Transfermium Wars
- Transformation optics
- Transformation theory (quantum mechanics)
- Transformer effect
- Transient equilibrium
- Transient flow
- Transient friction loading
- Transistor
- Transition Dipole Moment
- Transition boiling
- Transition dipole moment
- Transition edge sensor
- Transition of state
- Transition point
- Transition radiation
- Transition radiation detector
- Transition radiation tracker
- Transition rule
- Translation (physics)
- Translational lift
- Translational partition function
- Translational symmetry
- Transmission-line
- Transmission (mechanics)
- Transmission coefficient
- Transmission coefficient (optics)
- Transmission electron microscopy
- Transmission electron microscopy DNA sequencing
- Transmission line measurement
- Transmission medium
- Transmissometer
- Transmittance
- Transmitter power output
- Transmon
- Transonic
- Transonic speed
- Transparency and translucency
- Transparent ceramics
- Transparent conducting film
- Transport length
- Transport phenomena
- Transport phenomena (engineering & physics)
- Transuranic waste
- Transverse Doppler effect
- Transverse flow effect
- Transverse isotropy
- Transverse mass
- Transverse mode
- Transverse relaxation optimized spectroscopy
- Transverse wave
- Trapezoidal wing
- Trapped ion quantum computer
- Trapped null surface
- Traveling wave reactor
- Treatise on Natural Philosophy
- Trefftz plane
- Trench effect
- Tribimaximal mixing
- Triboelectric effect
- Tribology
- Triboluminescence
- Triclinic crystal system
- Trident laser
- Trigger (particle physics)
- Trigonal crystal system
- Trihydrogen cation
- Trim tab
- Trimaximal mixing
- Trinh Xuan Thuan
- Trinification
- Trinity (nuclear test)
- Trion (physics)
- Triple-alpha process
- Triple-resonance nuclear magnetic resonance spectroscopy
- Triple point
- Triple product rule
- Triplet lens
- Triplet state
- Trisonic wind tunnel
- Trisops
- Tritiated water
- Tritium
- Trojan wave packet
- Troland
- Tropical cyclone
- Tropical cyclone scales
- Tropospheric scatter
- Trotec
- Trouton's constant
- Trouton's ratio
- Trouton's ratio (rheology)
- Trouton–Noble experiment
- Trouton–Rankine experiment
- Troy ounce
- True anomaly
- Truss
- Trygve Røed-Larsen
- Tsallis entropy
- Tsiolkovsky rocket equation
- Tsirelson's bound
- Tsunami
- Tsunami warning system
- Tsung-Dao Lee
- Tullio Levi-Civita
- Tullio Regge
- Tunable laser
- Tunable metamaterials
- Tunable microwave device
- Tunnel injection
- Tunnel ionization
- Tunnel junction
- Tunnel magnetoresistance
- Turbidimetry
- Turbidity
- Turbidity current
- Turbidometry
- Turboexpander
- Turbophoresis
- Turbulator
- Turbulence
- Turbulence kinetic energy
- Turbulence modeling
- Turbulent Prandtl number
- Turbulent jet breakup
- Turgay Uzer
- Tuva or Bust!
- Twin Quasar
- Twin paradox
- Twisted nematic field effect
- Twisted sector
- Twistor space
- Twistor theory
- Two-balloon experiment
- Two-body Dirac equations
- Two-body problem
- Two-body problem in general relativity
- Two-color system
- Two-dimensional gas
- Two-dimensional nuclear magnetic resonance spectroscopy
- Two-dimensional point vortex gas
- Two-phase flow
- Two-photon absorption
- Two-photon physics
- Two-state quantum system
- Two-stream instability
- Two New Sciences
- Twyman–Green interferometer
- Tyndall effect
- Type-1.5 superconductor
- Type-II superconductor
- Type-I superconductor
- Type 0 string theory
- Type II string theory
- Type II supernova
- Type I Cepheid
- Type I Cepheids
- Type I string theory
- Type Ia supernova
- Type Ib and Ic supernovae
