= Tolman effect =

Tolman effect may refer to:

- Tolman surface brightness test: a cosmological effect causing the surface brightness of distant galaxies to reduce as (1+z)^4
- Ehrenfest–Tolman effect: a relativistic effect causing temperature to vary with spacetime curvature.
- Stewart–Tolman effect: a phenomenon in electrodynamics caused by the finite mass of electrons in conducting metal,
