= Tip Top =

Tip Top, Tip-Top or TipTop may refer to:

== Places ==
- Tip Top, Arizona, a ghost town
- Tiptop, Kentucky
- Tip-Top House, New Hampshire
- Tip Top (Clarksville, Tennessee), listed on the National Register of Historic Places (NRHP)
- Tip Top Building in White River Junction, Vermont
- Tiptop, Virginia

== Businesses ==
- Tip Top Bakeries, an Australian bread manufacturer
- Ward Baking Company, makers of Tip-Top Bread
- Tip-Top Restaurant, franchise in Nicaragua
- Tip Top Tailors, a Canadian menswear company
  - Tip Top Tailors Building, their former headquarters and a heritage industrial building in Toronto, Canada
- Tip-Top, a British pharmacy chain taken over by Superdrug in 1987
- TipTop Technologies, search engine
- Le Tip Top, a bar and restaurant in Monte Carlo
- Tip Top (ice cream), a New Zealand product
- Tip-Top Products, manufacturer of hair care products

== Entertainment ==
- Brooklyn Tip-Tops, American baseball team
- Radio Tip Top, a BBC Radio 1 comedy show from the 1990s
- TipTop (band), a German band
- TipTop (video game)
- Congo Bongo, a 1983 Sega arcade game, also called Tip Top
- Tip Top (film), a 2013 French film
- Tip-Top, a fictional singer portrayed by Jarvis Cocker in The French Dispatch, artist of Chansons d'Ennui Tip-Top

== Other ==
- Tip Top, an amusement/carnival attraction manufactured by Frank Hrubetz & Company
- TIPTOP website, The Internet Pilot to Physics
- Tippe top, a toy top
