= Slack tide =

Short period in a body of tidal water

Slack tide or slack water is the short period in a body of tidal water when the water is completely unstressed, and there is no movement either way in the tidal stream. It occurs before the direction of the tidal stream reverses. Slack water can be estimated using a tidal atlas or the tidal diamond information on a nautical chart. The time of slack water, particularly in constricted waters, does not occur at high and low water, and in certain areas, such as Primera Angostura, the ebb may run for up to three hours after the water level has started to rise. Similarly, the flood may run for up to three hours after the water has started to fall. In 1884, Thornton Lecky illustrated the phenomenon with an inland basin of infinite size, connected to the sea by a narrow mouth. Since the level of the basin is always at mean sea level, the flood in the mouth starts at half tide, and its velocity is at its greatest at the time of high water, with the strongest ebb occurring conversely at low water.

== Implications for seafarers ==
For scuba divers, the absence of a flow means that less effort is required to swim and there is less likelihood of drifting away from a vessel or shore. Slack water following high tide can improve underwater visibility, as the previously incoming tide brings clear water with it. Following low tide, visibility can be reduced as the ebb draws silt, mud, and other particulates with it. In areas with potentially dangerous tides and currents, it is standard practice for divers to plan a dive at slack times.

For any vessel, a favourable flow will improve the vessel's speed over the bottom for a given speed in the water. Difficult channels are also more safely navigated during slack water, as any flow may set a vessel out of a channel into danger.

== Combined tidal stream and current ==
In many locations, in addition to the tidal streams there is also a current causing the tidal stream in the one direction to be stronger than, and last for longer than the stream in the opposite direction six hours later. Variations in the strength of that current will also vary the time when the stream reverses, thus altering the time and duration of slack water. Variations in wind stress also directly affect the height of the tide, and the inverse relationship between the height of the tide and atmospheric pressure is well understood (1 cm change in sea level for each 1 mb change in pressure) while the duration of slack water at a given location is inversely related to the height of the tide at that location.

== Misconceptions ==
Slack water is different from the 'stand of the tide', which is when tide levels 'stand' at a maximum or minimum (i.e., at that moment in time, not rising or falling).

== Dodge tides ==
Some localities have unusual tidal characteristics, such as Gulf St Vincent, South Australia, where the amplitudes of the main semi-diurnal tide constituents are almost identical. At neap tides the semi-diurnal tide is virtually absent, resulting in the phenomenon known as a "dodge tide"—a day-long period of slack water—occurring twice a month; this effect is accentuated near the equinoxes when the diurnal component also vanishes, resulting in a period of 2–3 days of slack water.

== See also ==
- Stability theory, a main mathematical concept considering forces in equilibrium.
