= Richard C. Tolman =

American physicist (1881–1948)

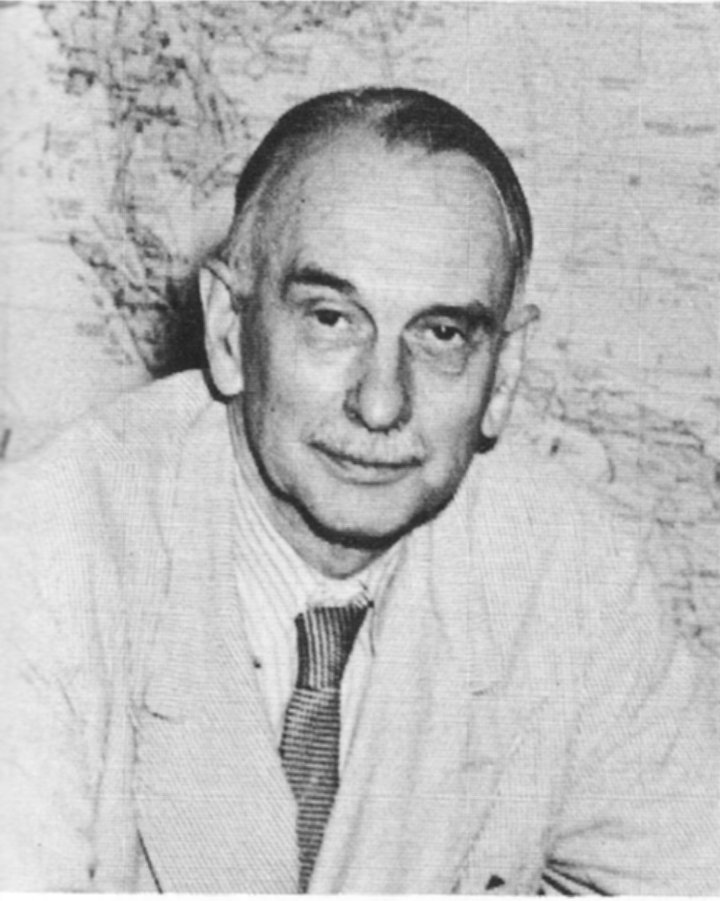
- Richard C. Tolman in 1945
- Born: Richard Chace Tolman; March 4, 1881; West Newton, Massachusetts, U.S.
- Died: September 5, 1948 (aged 67); Pasadena, California, U.S.
- Education: Massachusetts Institute of Technology (BS, PhD)
- Scientific career
- Fields: Physical chemistry Statistical mechanics Cosmology
- Workplaces: California Institute of Technology
- Thesis: The Electromotive Force Produced in Solutions by Centrifugal Action (1910)
- Doctoral advisor: Arthur Amos Noyes
- Doctoral students: Allan C. G. Mitchell; Linus Pauling

Richard Chace Tolman (March 4, 1881 – September 5, 1948) was an American mathematical physicist and physical chemist who made many contributions to statistical mechanics and theoretical cosmology. He was a professor at the California Institute of Technology (Caltech).

== Early life and education ==
Tolman was born in West Newton, Massachusetts to a successful businessman and a Quaker mother. Tolman attended the local public schools before matriculating at the Massachusetts Institute of Technology (MIT), where he earned his bachelor's degree in chemical engineering 1903. He spent the following year studying abroad in Germany before returning to MIT for further studies. He was mentored by Arthur Amos Noyes, a pioneer of physical chemistry, and received PhD in 1910 under Noyes' supervision. He subsequently worked briefly at various universities before the outbreak of World War I.

== Scientific career ==
In 1912, he conceived of the concept of relativistic mass, writing that "the expression $m_0 \left(1 - \frac{v^2}{c^2} \right)^{-1/2}$ is best suited for the mass of a moving body."

During the First World War, Tolman served in the Chemical Warfare Service, attaining the rank of Major. When the war ended, he continued working for the government for some years, researching nitrogen fixation.

In a 1916 experiment with Thomas Dale Stewart, Tolman demonstrated that electricity consists of electrons flowing through a metallic conductor. A by-product of this experiment was a measured value of the mass of the electron. This early work sparked Tolman's interest in chemical kinetics and statistical mechanics. Tolman and his collaborators at the Fixed Nitrogen Research Laboratory at the University of California thanked the government for enabling them to conduct fundamental research that had little immediate relevance to their assigned project, writing that "such a liberal policy is of great importance in maintaining a proper scientific attitude on the part of the staff of a research laboratory."

Tolman was a member of the Technical Alliance in 1919, a forerunner of the Technocracy movement where he helped conduct an energy survey analyzing the possibility of applying science to social and industrial affairs.

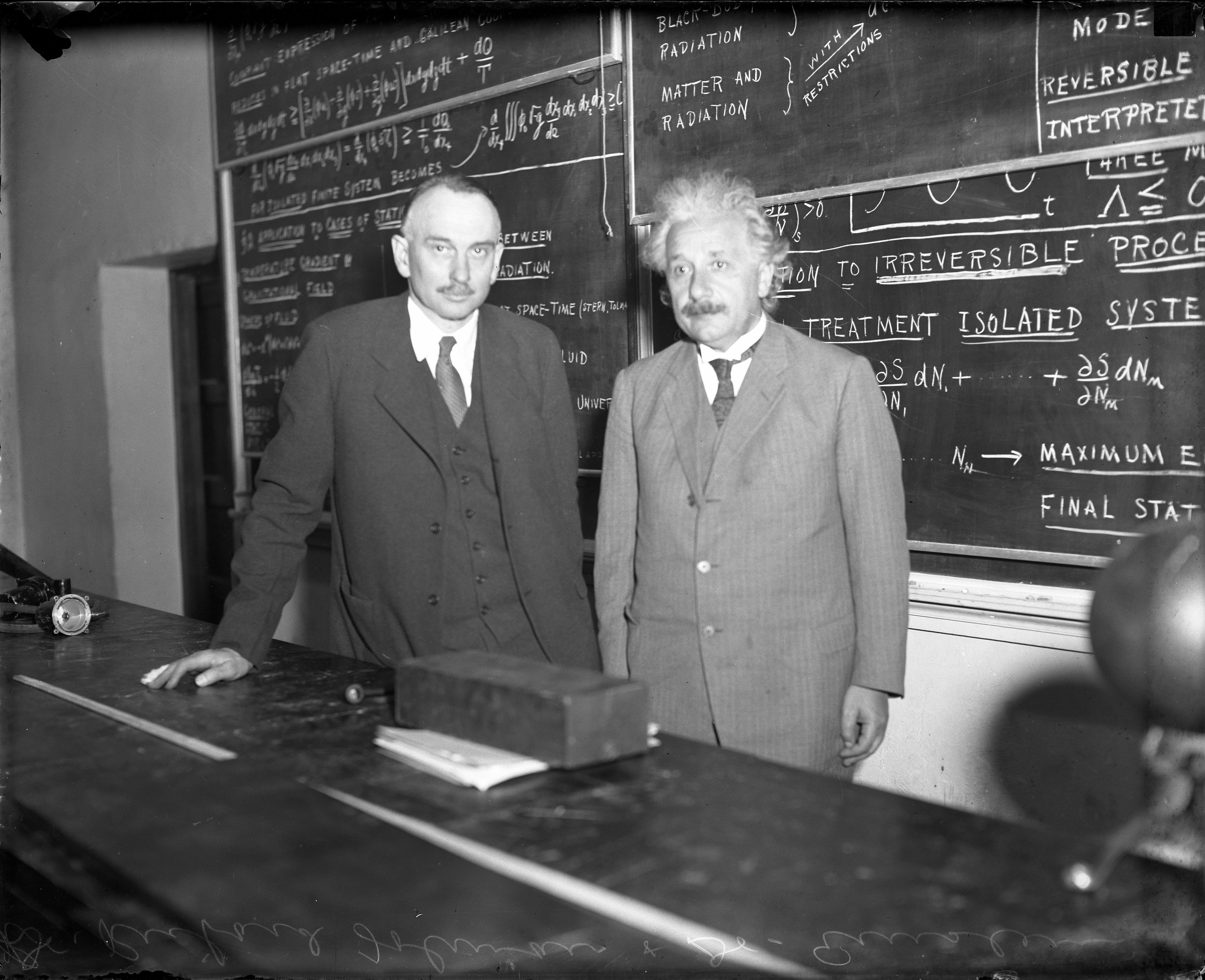
Richard C. Tolman and Albert Einstein at Caltech, Pasadena, 1932

Tolman was elected a Fellow of the American Academy of Arts and Sciences in 1922. The same year, he joined the faculty of the California Institute of Technology, where he became professor of physical chemistry and mathematical physics and later Dean of Graduate Studies. One of Tolman's early students at Caltech was the theoretical chemist Linus Pauling, to whom Tolman taught the old quantum theory. Tolman was elected to the National Academy of Sciences of the United States in 1923. His years at Caltech were his most productive.

In 1927, Tolman published a text on statistical mechanics whose background was the old quantum theory of Max Planck, Niels Bohr and Arnold Sommerfeld. Tolman was elected to the American Philosophical Society in 1932. In 1938, he published a new detailed work that covered the application of statistical mechanics to classical and quantum systems. In his work on the subject, Tolman built heavily upon the key contributions of Ludwig Boltzmann, J. Willard Gibbs, Paul and Tatyana Ehrenfest.

Tolman took an interest in general relativity. He researched the application of thermodynamics to relativistic systems and cosmology. He established a number of theoretical results important in the study of an expanding universe. In his 1934 monograph titled Relativity, Thermodynamics, and Cosmology, Tolman demonstrated how black body thermal radiation in an expanding universe results in cooling – a key pointer toward the properties of the cosmic microwave background. Also in this monograph, Tolman was the first person to document and explain how a closed universe could possess net zero energy. He explained how all mass energy is positive and all gravitational energy is negative and they cancel each other out, leading to a universe of zero energy. His investigation of the oscillatory universe hypothesis, which Alexander Friedmann had proposed in 1922, drew attention to difficulties as regards entropy and resulted in its demise until the late 1960s. Tolman interpreted astronomical observations in terms of the new cosmology in collaboration with Edwin Hubble.

During the 1930s, Tolman obtained solutions to the Einstein field equations describing the static spherically symmetric perfect fluid. It was Tolman who spurred J. Robert Oppenheimer's interest in relativistic astrophysics by introducing to astronomers working at the Mount Wilson Observatory in Pasadena, California. Oppenheimer, Robert Serber, and George Volkoff, built upon Tolman's work in their investigation of the stability of neutron stars, obtaining the Tolman-Oppenheimer-Volkoff limit.

During World War II, Tolman served as scientific advisor to General Leslie Groves on the Manhattan Project. He resumed civilian life in 1947 and published some papers on the thermodynamics of surface phases. He died on September 5, 1948, three weeks after suffering a cerebral hemorrhage without warning. At the time of his death in Pasadena, he was chief advisor to Bernard Baruch, the U.S. representative to the United Nations Atomic Energy Commission.

Each year, the southern California section of the American Chemical Society honors Tolman by awarding its Tolman Medal "in recognition of outstanding contributions to chemistry."

== Family ==
Tolman's brother was the behavioral psychologist Edward Chace Tolman. He married psychologist Ruth Sherman Tolman in 1924.

== Gallery ==
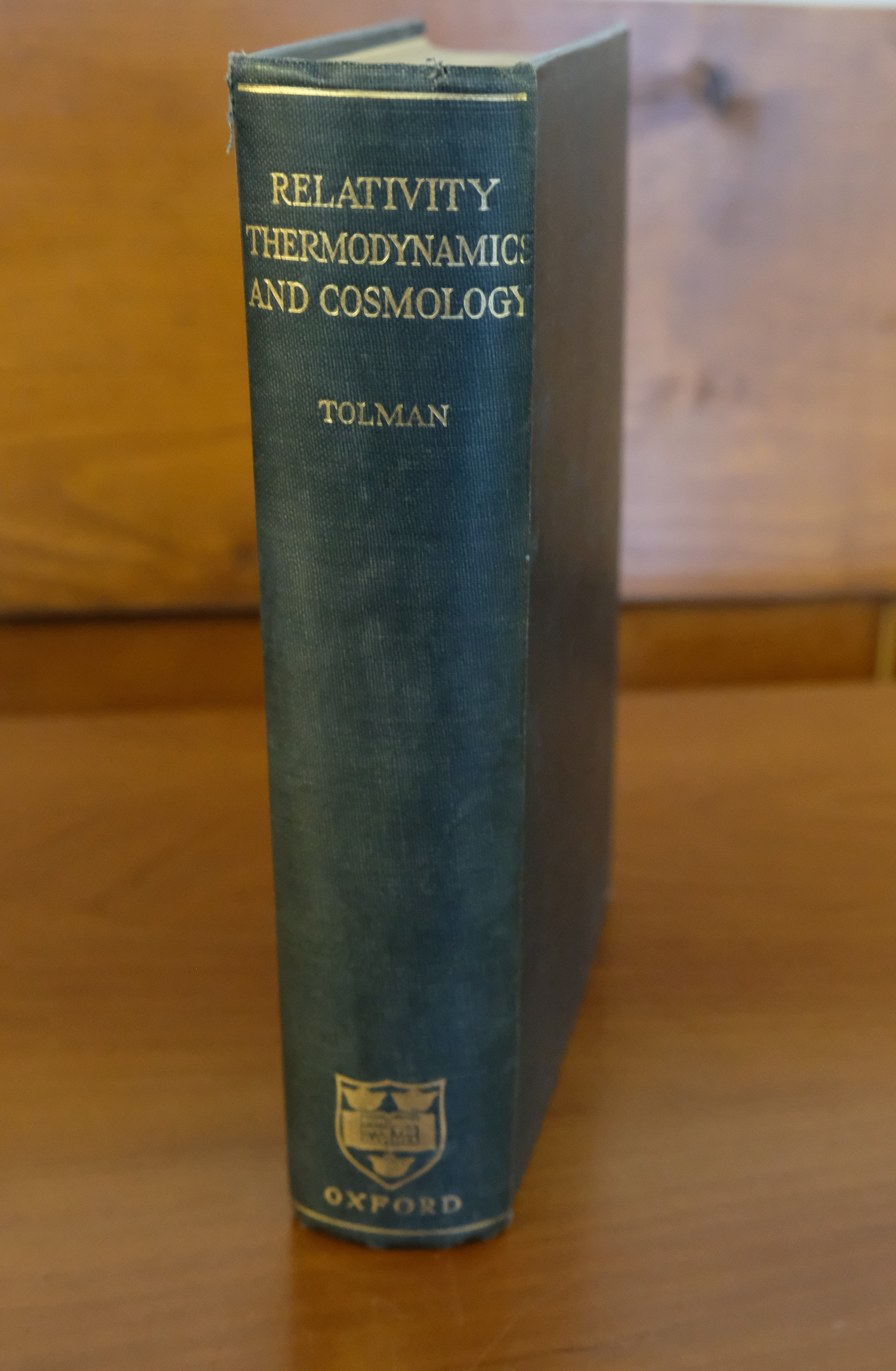
Relativity, Thermodynamics and Cosmology (1934)

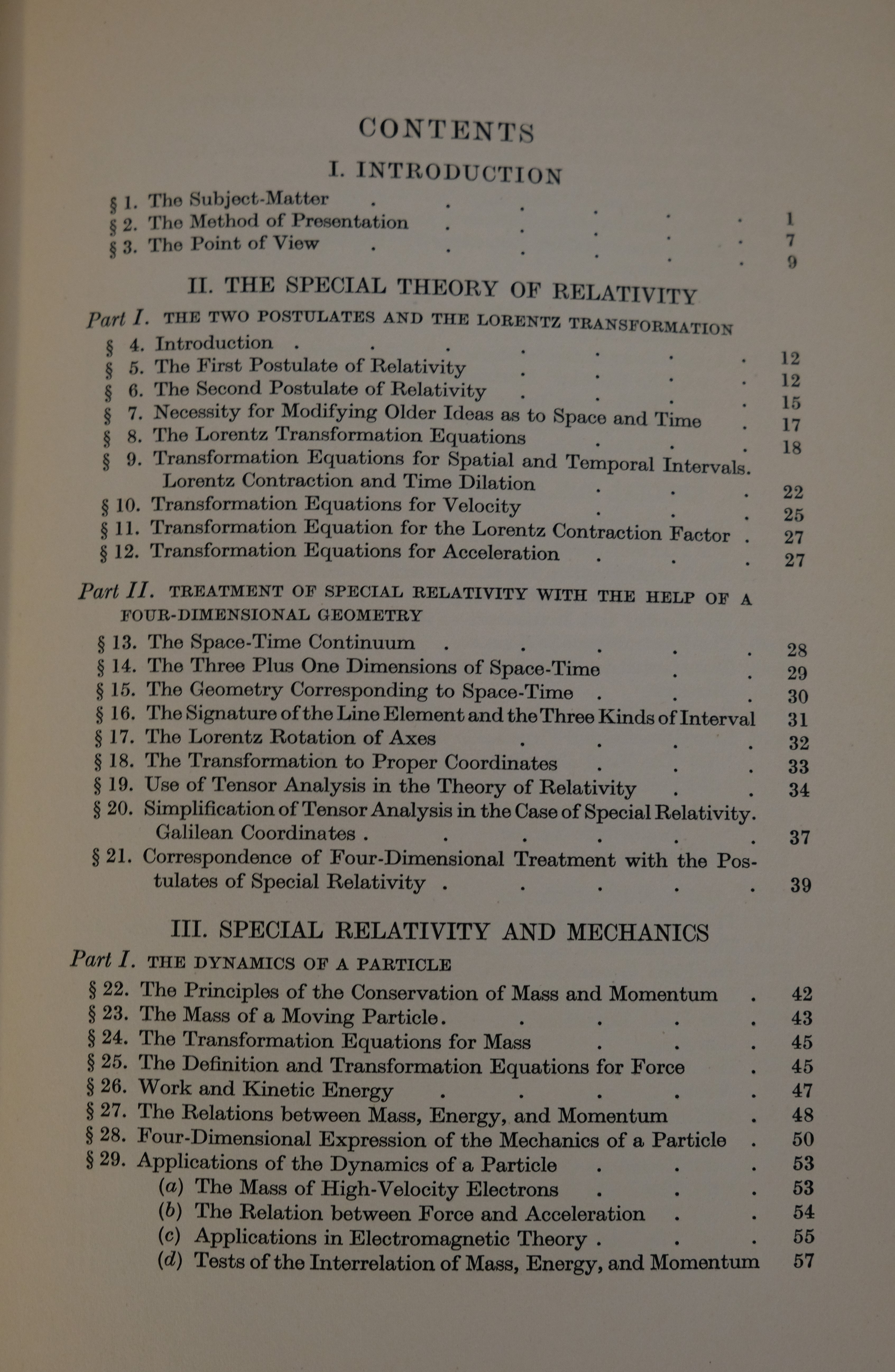
Table of contents to Relativity, Thermodynamics and Cosmology (1934)

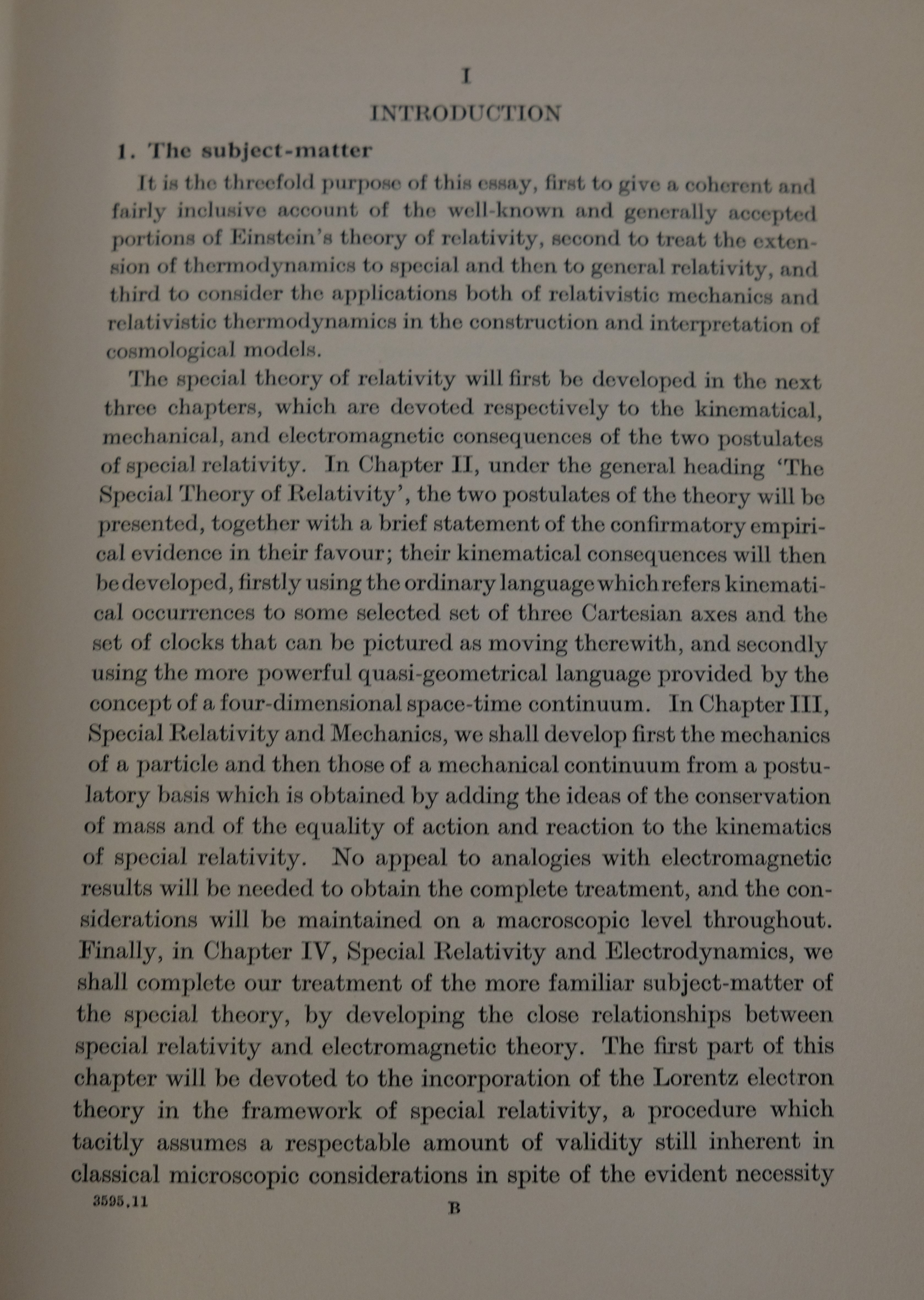
Introduction to Relativity, Thermodynamics and Cosmology (1934)

== Bibliography ==
- Statistical mechanics with applications to physics and chemistry. New York: The Chemical Catalog Company. 1927.
- Relativity, Thermodynamics, and Cosmology. Oxford: Clarendon Press. 1934. LCCN 34032023. Reissued (1987) New York: Dover ISBN 0-486-65383-8.
- The Principles of Statistical Mechanics. Oxford: Clarendon Press. 1938. ISBN 9780486638966 Reissued (1979) New York: Dover ISBN 0-486-63896-0. Tolman, Richard Chace (January 1987). 1987 Dover reprint. Courier Corporation. ISBN 9780486653839.

== See also ==
- List of textbooks in thermodynamics and statistical mechanics
- Tolman length
- Tolman surface brightness test
- Tolman's paradox
- Tolman's H theorem
- Tolman–Ehrenfest effect
- Tolman–Oppenheimer–Volkoff equation
- Lemaître–Tolman metric
- Lewis–Tolman paradox
- Stewart–Tolman effect
- Oscillatory universe
- Thin Man (nuclear bomb)
