= Wilmot N. Hess =

American Physicist

Wilmot Hess
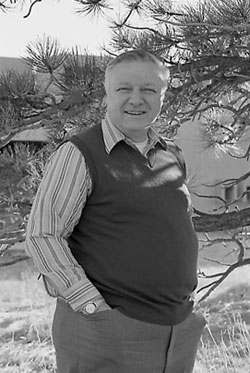
- Wilmot Hess at NCAR
- Born: October 16, 1926; Oberlin, Ohio
- Died: April 16, 2004 (aged 77); Berkeley, California
- Education: PhD. UC Berkeley; MA Oberlin College; BS Columbia University
- Known for: Van Allen radiation belt Apollo 11 science and technology
- Scientific career
- Workplaces: Lawrence Livermore Labs; NASA; NOAA; NCAR; Department of Energy

Dr. Wilmot N. Hess (October 16, 1926 – April 16, 2004) was an American physicist who was involved with many ambitious scientific projects of the 20th century, including the Plowshares project, the NASA Apollo Moon missions, the National Oceanic and Atmospheric Administration (NOAA) hurricane research and oil spill cleanup research, the National Center for Atmospheric Research (NCAR) weather modification research, and the U.S. Department of Energy Superconducting Super Collider (SSC) project. Hess retired as the first associate director of the United States Department of Energy, when the office was created in 1977. He lived in California and died of leukemia on April 16, 2004, at the age of 77.

== Early life and education ==
Hess was born on October 16, 1926, in Oberlin, Ohio, to Walter and Rachel (Metcalf) Hess. The family moved to Clinton, New York, where he grew up during the Great Depression. He attended a one-room schoolhouse for the first six grades, with only three in his class but plenty of opportunity to "skip ahead" due to the comingled age groups. He received his B.S. in electrical engineering from Columbia University in 1946 at the age of 19 in electrical engineering. In his privately published Wilmot's World autobiography, he wrote:

I took the test to get into the Navy V-12 program... We had military drills and wore Navy uniforms, but it was mostly just going to college. The first entry in our Navy log every day started out "USS Hartley Hall securely moored at Broadway and 116th Street..." The Commodore in charge of all Naval Officer Procurement had his office in our building. We apprentice seamen stood watch near his door. At 4 pm we had to go in and say (with a straight face): "Sir, the time is reported as 1600. The galley fires are out and the prisoners are ashore." If you smiled during the presentation, you might be thrown in the brig (jail).

He was 87th in his family line to go to Oberlin College, where he received his M.A. in physics in 1949. Hess then attended the University of California at Berkeley where he received his Ph.D. in physics in 1954.

Bill married Winifred Esther (Westher) Lowdermilk in June 1950, during his first year of graduate school at UC Berkeley. They had three children.

== Career ==
- 1954 - Lawrence Livermore Labs, working on nuclear weapons. Frequent travel to Nevada Test site.
- 1957 - Radiation Lab in Berkeley, to work at the bevatron and on the health physics team.
- 1959 - Project director of Plowshare (peaceful uses of atomic bombs) at Livermore. Technical advisor at the Nuclear Test Ban Conference in Geneva.
- 1961 - Director of Theoretical Division at NASA. Measured cosmic ray neutrons in space and was the first to make a quantitative energy spectrum on them. From Wilmot's World: "I always felt a little bit like a fraud as Director of the Theoretical Division, not really being a theorist."
- Goddard Space Flight Center. From Wilmot's World: "My years at Goddard were very happy and productive. The space program was just a few years old. I organized a series of Friday afternoon seminars on space research. Almost every week we heard about something brand new about space. The director of Goddard was an aeronautical engineer, Harry Goett. He was a fine man with a research background and gave us a lot of freedom.... My own research was on the Van Allen radiation belt. [We developed] a theory to explain how solar protons can diffuse inward and gain energy in the Earth's magnetic field. This quantitatively explained the observed Leo Davis protons."
- 1966 - Director of Science and Applications for Apollo Moon Program, in Houston.
- 1969 - Director of the Research Labs of the National Oceanic and Atmospheric Association (NOAA) in Boulder, Colorado.
- 1980-1986 - Director of National Center for Atmospheric Research (NCAR) in Boulder, CO.
- 1986 - Director of the High Energy and Nuclear Physics Program at the Department of Energy, Washington, D.C.
- 1996 - Retired. From Wilmot's World: "I have much enjoyed wandering through Space Science and meteorology and oceanography and changing fields every decade. I think it was a lot more fun than staying in one place and doing one thing all my life...."

== Books ==
- Introduction to Space Science (1965) (co-author: Gilbert D. Mead)
- The nature of the lunar surface; proceedings of the 1965 IAU-NASA Symposium. (1966)
- The Radiation Belt and Magnetosphere (1968)
- Weather and Climate Modification (1974)
- The Amoco Cadiz oil spill : a preliminary scientific report (1978)

== Awards ==
- 1965: Arthur S. Flemming Award
- 1969: NASA Group Achievement Award
- 1969: American Institute of Aeronautics and Astronautics G. Edward Pendray Award
- 197x: Honorary D. Sc., Oberlin College, Oberlin, Ohio
