= Optical feedback =

Optical phenomenon

Optical feedback (OF) is an optical phenomenon that involves a part of the coherent emission light from a laser returns to the laser cavity. The effect is typical for any laser, although the cause of the feedback light varies: reflection from optical components, fiber edges, spectroscopy cell windows. Operation of the semiconductor laser is very sensitive to OF due to its very high intrinsic gain and chirping effect, as well as the relaxation oscillation.

Upon return, the feedback light will be delayed with respect to the light in the cavity, and will have different phase, thus either amplifying or suppressing the laser output. While the recombination of the feedback light and light already in the cavity is usually linear, the delay, high gain, chirping, and relaxation oscillation create complex dynamic effects at the output.

In the case of the optical resonator, this is accomplished by parallel mirrors which cause light to be reflected within the lasing cavity, allowing for a single photon to be amplified several times by the lasing medium, while in the case of the Random laser, this is a result of internal scattering within the lasing medium.

Optical feedback may result in significant changes in output power for semiconductor lasers, and if unchecked can cause serious damage. This has been exploited for chaotic output power in semiconductor lasers.

== Sources ==
- Lenstra, Daan; Vemuri, Gautam; Yousefi, Mirvais (2005-03-24). "Generalized Optical Feedback: Theory". Unlocking Dynamical Diversity. Wiley. doi:10.1002/0470856211.ch3. ISBN 978-0-470-85619-2.
- Ohtsubo, Junji (2017). "Theory of Optical Feedback in Semiconductor Lasers". Semiconductor Lasers. Optical Sciences. Vol. 111. Berlin, Heidelberg: Springer Berlin Heidelberg. pp. 83–112. doi:10.1007/978-3-540-72650-0_4. ISBN 978-3-540-72647-0.
