= Heat generation in integrated circuits =

Tendency of electrical circuits to produce excess heat while operating

The heat dissipation in integrated circuits problem has gained increasing interest in recent years due to the miniaturization of semiconductor devices. The temperature increase becomes relevant for cases of relatively small-cross-sections wires, because such temperature increase may affect the normal behavior of semiconductor devices.

== Joule heating ==
Joule heating is a predominant heat mechanism for heat generation in integrated circuits and is an undesired effect.

== Propagation ==
The governing equation of the physics of the problem to be analyzed is the heat diffusion equation. It relates the flux of heat in space, its variation in time and the generation of power.

$$\nabla\left(\kappa\nabla T\right)+g=\rho C\frac{\partial T}{\partial t}$$

Where $\kappa$ is the thermal conductivity, $\rho$ is the density of the medium, $C$ is the specific heat

$$k=\frac{\kappa}{\rho C} \,$$

the thermal diffusivity and $g$ is the rate of heat generation per unit volume. Heat diffuses from the source following equation ([eq:diffusion]) and solution in a homogeneous medium of ([eq:diffusion]) has a Gaussian distribution.

== See also ==
- Thermal simulations for integrated circuits
- Thermal design power
- Thermal management in electronics
