= Transition point =

In the field of fluid dynamics the point at which the boundary layer changes from laminar to turbulent is called the transition point. Where and how this transition occurs depends on the Reynolds number, the pressure gradient, pressure fluctuations due to sound, surface vibration, the initial turbulence level of the flow, boundary layer suction, surface heat flows, and surface roughness. The effects of a boundary layer turned turbulent are an increase in drag due to skin friction. As speed increases, the upper surface transition point tends to move forward. As the angle of attack increases, the upper surface transition point also tends to move forward.

== Position ==
The exact position of the transition point is hard to determine due to it being dependent on a large amount of factors. Several methods to predict it to a certain degree of accuracy do exist, however. Most of these methods revolve around analysing the stability of the (laminar) boundary layer using stability theory: a laminar boundary layer may become unstable due to small disturbances, turning it turbulent. One such method assessing the transition point this way is the e^{N} method.

=== e^{N} method ===
The e^{N} method works by superimposing small disturbances on the flow, considering it to be laminar. The assumption is made that both the original and the newly disturbed flow satisfy the Navier-Stokes equations. This disturbed flow can be linearised and described with a perturbation equation. This equation may have unstable solutions. Any such case where a disturbance is caused where the perturbation equation has unstable solutions can be considered unstable, and hence could lead to a transition point. This method assumes a flow parallel to the boundary layer with a constant shape, which will not always be the case in analysis. The method can be used to determine the local (in)stability at the span-wise position, however. If a local transition occurs, it must also occur under the same circumstances on the global frame. This analysis can be repeated for multiple span-wise stations. As the transition point is determined by the first point where this happens, only the point closest to the leading edge where this happens is sought for.

A two-dimensional disturbance stream function can be defined as $\Psi(x,y,t) = \phi(y)e^{-\alpha_i x}e^{i(\alpha_r x - \omega t)}$, from which the disturbance velocity components in the x- and y directions follow from $u' = \frac{\partial \Psi}{\partial y}; v' = -\frac{\partial \Psi}{\partial x}$. Here the circular frequency ω is taken to be the real in the disturbance stream, and the wave number α complex. Hence, in the case of an instability, the complex part of the wave number needs to be positive for there to be a growing disturbance. Any prior disturbance passing through will be amplified by $\sigma_a = \ln{\frac{a}{a_0}} = \int_{x0}^x - \alpha_i dx$, where x0 is the value of x where the disturbance with frequency ω first becomes unstable (known as the Orr-Sommerfeld equation). Experiments by Smith and Gamberoni, and later by Van Ingen have shown that transition occurs when the amplification factor (being the critical amplification factor) equals 9. For clean wind tunnels and for atmospheric turbulence, the critical amplification factors equals 12 and 4 in that order.

Experiments have shown that the largest factors affecting the position where this happens are the shape of the velocity profile over the lift-generating surface, the Reynolds number, and the frequency or wavelength of the disturbances itself.

Behind the transition point in a boundary layer the mean speed and friction drag increases.
