= The Astronomy and Astrophysics Review =

- Discipline: Astronomy
- Language: English
- Edited by: Francesca Matteucci

Publication details
- History: 1989-present
- Publisher: Springer-Verlag GmbH Germany, part of Springer Nature
- Impact factor: 25.357 (2020)

Standard abbreviations
- ISO 4: Astron. Astrophys. Rev.

Indexing
- ISSN: 0935-4956 (print); 1432-0754 (web)
- OCLC no.: 42856614

Links
- Journal homepage; Online access

The Astronomy and Astrophysics Review is a peer-reviewed scientific journal that is published quarterly by Springer-Verlag GmbH Germany, part of Springer Nature. The editor-in-chief is Francesca Matteucci. The first issue was published in April 1989.

== Scope ==
The journal publishes invited reviews on all areas of astronomy and astrophysics, including cosmic ray physics, studies on the Solar System, astrobiology, developments in laboratory or particle physics directly relevant to astronomy, instrumentation, computational or statistical methods with specific astronomical applications, and other subjects relevant to astronomy and astrophysics.

== Abstracting and indexing ==
This journal is indexed in the following databases:

- Current Contents/Physical, Chemical & Earth Sciences
- Science Citation Index
- Academic OneFile
- Academic Search
- Astrophysics Data System
- Computer & Control Abstracts
- Electrical & Electronics Abstracts
- Physics Abstracts
- Earthquake Engineering Abstracts
- Engineered Materials Abstracts
- EI-Compendex
- ProQuest
- Scopus
- SIMBAD Astronomical Database
- SPIRES
- VINITI
