= Tidal atlas =

Coastal maps showing tidal flows

A tidal atlas or a tidal stream atlas is used to predict the direction and speed of tidal currents.

A tidal atlas usually consists of a set of 12 or 13 diagrams, one for each hour of the tidal cycle, for a coastal region. Each diagram uses arrows to indicate the direction of the flow at that time. The speed of the flow is shown by the length and thickness of the arrows. For all except the smallest arrows numbers give more precise information. Areas of slack water may be indicated by no arrows or the words "slack water". UK Admiralty Tidal Atlases show speed in units of tenth of a knot. Two figures are given separated by a comma, the first is the mean neap rate and the second the mean spring rate. The dot of the comma indicates where the observations were made. It is important to realise that the tidal hour lasts from half an hour before the nominal time to half an hour after. For instance the chart for 3 hours after high water is valid from HW+2½ to HW+3½, not from HW+3 to HW+4.

Tidal atlases may provide additional information for areas such as estuaries where it important to calculate tides away from the ports. Such information may include co-tidal range information and time differences.

To calculate the rate at an intermediate tide between neap and spring, interpolation is required. Traditionally this has been done using a "calculation of rates" chart found inside tidal atlases.

An alternative to a tidal atlas is a nautical chart that provides tidal diamonds.

== Citations ==
- Cunliffe, Tom (2017). The complete yachtmaster: sailing, seamanship and navigation for the modern yacht skipper. ISBN 978-1-4729-4343-9.
- Noice, Alison (2015). Yachtmaster for sail & power: a manual for the RYA yachtmaster certificates of competence. ISBN 978-1-4729-2549-7.
- United Kingdom Hydrographic Office (2015). Admiralty tidal stream atlas: Thames estuary (Edition 2 - 1985 (Reprinted 2015) ed.). Taunton: United Kingdom Hydrographic Office. ISBN 978-0-7077-2123-1.
