= Thomas Dale Stewart =

Thomas Dale Stewart (August 14, 1890 – February 6, 1958) was an American chemist.

He was born at Sumner, Washington, and received his Ph.D. degree in chemistry from University of California at Berkeley in 1916. After one year of research at University of Chicago under Julius Stieglitz, he returned to Berkeley as an instructor in the chemistry department, and became a professor there in 1935.

His early research was about the mechanism of electron conduction in metals. The collaborative work with Richard C. Tolman led to the discovery of Stewart–Tolman effect. Later he worked on acid-base equilibria of organic nitrogen compounds, as well as reaction kinetics.
