= Topological censorship =

Topological censorship helps to explain why the observable topology of space appear to be trivial. It is the statement that, in a variety of physically reasonable spacetimes, isolated topological structures cannot be actively probed; they collapse too quickly to allow traversal by any signal propagating at a speed no greater than the speed of light. First shown for globally hyperbolic, asymptotically flat spacetimes satisfying an averaged null energy condition, the topological censorship principle has been extended to a variety of more general conditions on the causal structure and asymptotics of spacetime and has been given more precise mathematical characterizations. It has been used to obtain results on the topology of black hole horizons, and it underlies the requirement of exotic matter to support traversable wormholes.

== The topological censorship theorem ==
The first topological censorship theorem showed that in a globally hyperbolic, asymptotically flat spacetime satisfying the null energy condition, every causal curve from past null infinity to future null infinity is fixed-endpoint homotopic to a curve in a topologically trivial neighbourhood of infinity.

The key insight is that any causal curve in an asymptotic region that can detect the nontrivial topology of an asymptotically flat spacetime containing an isolated topological structure must lift to a causal curve in the universal covering space that travels from a copy of the original asymptotic region to a disconnected asymptotic region. However, such a causal curve cannot exist: under the conditions of the theorem, the covering space of a spacetime with nontrivial topology has the same characteristics as the maximally extended Schwarzschild spacetime; a causal curve from an asymptotic region cannot reach a disconnected asymptotic region.

The maximally extended Schwarzschild spacetime has two asymptotic regions connected by a wormhole, also known as the Einstein-Rosen bridge. This wormhole is the time symmetric slice of the maximally extended Schwarzchild spacetime. However, although spacelike curves can traverse the wormhole, causal curves cannot: The wormhole collapses too quickly for even light to traverse it. This is illustrated in the Penrose-Carter diagram of the maximally extended Schwarzschild spacetime. Any causal curve leaving from a point on the past null infinity of region I must lie on or above the radially inward directed null geodesic γ. As γ does not enter region III, no causal curve from a point on past null infinity of region I can enter region III. Therefore, the past null infinity of region I cannot be seen from the future null infinity of region III.

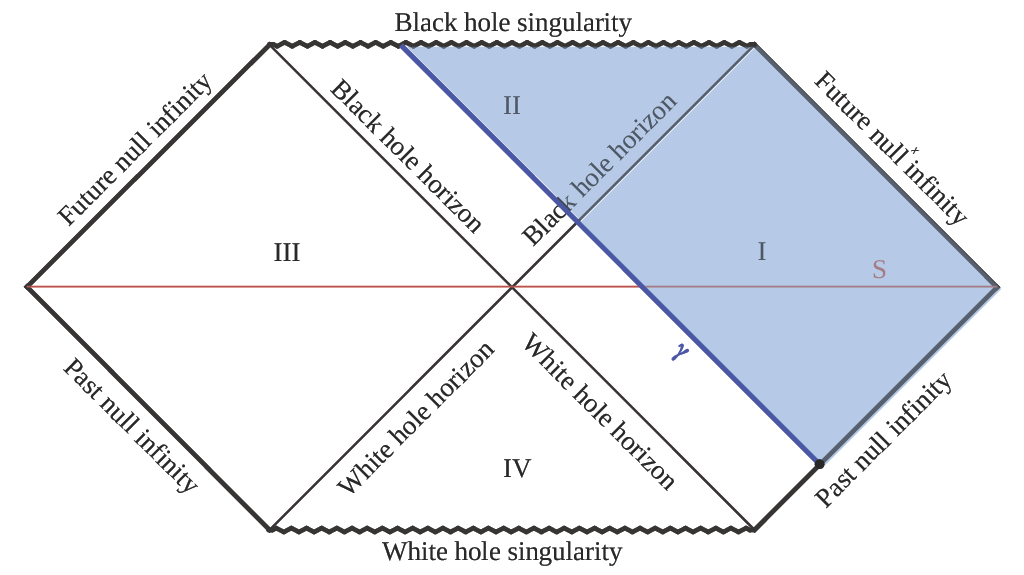
The Penrose-Carter diagram of maximally extended Schwarzschild spacetime. Each point on the diagram represents a two dimensional sphere. Radially directed inward and outward null geodesics travel at 45^{o} angles at all points in the diagram. The surface S is the time symmetric slice and is a spatial wormhole connecting region I to III. S is a Cauchy surface of the maximally extended spacetime.

This feature of Schwarzschild spacetime also holds for a set of much more general spacetimes that satisfy conditions that make the behavior of the cover of these spacetimes the same as that of the maximally extended Schwarzschild spacetime (itself the universal cover of the spacetime known as the $\mathbb{RP}^3$ geon). These conditions are: 1) the existence of an inner trapped surface (i.e. radial null geodesics directed inward from region I toward region III are converging); 2) an energy condition that ensures that null geodesics that are initially converging are focussed according to the Raychaudhuri equation; 3) a condition that the spacetime is physically predictable, that is, that the spacetime at any point is determined by its properties to the past of that point. The topological censorship theorem proves that if these conditions are satisfied, then there is no causal curve from past null infinity to future null infinity in an asymptotic region that can detect an isolated topological structure.

Spacetimes that violate topological censorship must violate the assumed conditions. In particular, traversible wormholes violate the null energy condition; they contain exotic matter that counteracts the gravitational attraction of physical matter and that of the curvature of spacetime itself.

== Generalizations ==
Many generalizations and improvements to the initial theorem have been made. Galloway showed that topological censorship is equivalent to the statement that the domain of outer communication (the region exterior to both black hole and white hole horizons) is simply connected. The theorem was generalized to spacetimes that satisfy weak cosmic censorship; this paper also addressed and resolved minor technical issues present in the original theorem. Topological censorship has also been proven in spacetimes with different asymptotic conditions such as asymptotically anti-de Sitter spacetimes and Kaluza-Klein spacetimes. Mathematical refinements and technical details have been further discussed in.

== Applications ==
Topological censorship has been used to generalize theorems regarding the topology of black hole horizons. Chrusciel and Wald were able to improve Hawking's theorem on the topology of stationary black hole horizons to a topological result requiring only the null energy condition. Jacobson and Venkataramani generalized this result to nonstationary black hole horizons in asymptotically flat spacetimes. Galloway et al. extended the Jacobson-Venkataramani result to asymptotically anti-de-Sitter spacetimes; although cross sections of the black hole horizons no longer are required to be spherical, their topology remains restricted by that of the domain of outer communication.
