= Taketani Mitsuo =

Japanese physicist (1911–2000)

- 武谷 三男
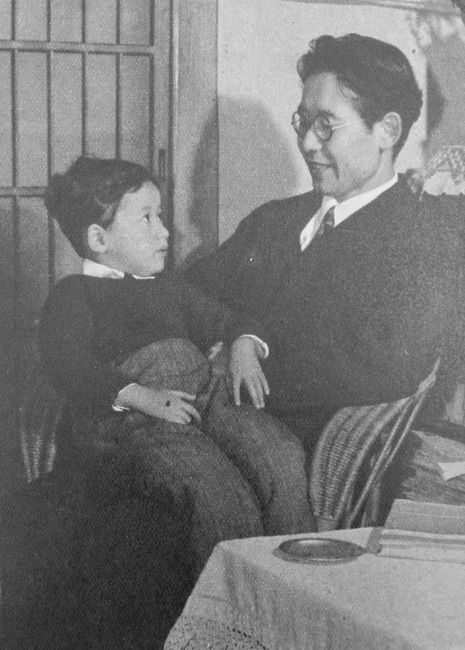
- Taketani with his son in 1949
- Born: October 2, 1911; Ōmuta, Empire of Japan
- Died: April 22, 2000 (aged 88)
- Scientific career
- Fields: Physics
- Workplaces: Tōkai University; Osaka University; Kyoto University

Taketani Mitsuo (武谷 三男; October 2, 1911 – April 22, 2000) was a prominent Japanese theoretical physicist and Marxist intellectual. He published his Doctrine of the Three Stages of Scientific Development in 1936. This was the first Japanese contribution to the philosophy of science.

He was jailed in 1938 following making contributions to the Marxist journal Sekai Bunka (World Culture). However, following the intervention of Yoshio Nishina, he was released into the custody of his professor, Hideki Yukawa.

== Life and career ==
Taketani Mitsuo graduated from Kyoto University in 1934 with a degree in physics. He pursued research in nuclear and elementary particle theory as a collaborator with Hideki Yukawa and Shoichi Sakata. Meanwhile, along with Shoichi Nakai and Osamu Kuno, he was arrested twice for participating in the anti-fascist magazines Sekai Bunka and Saturday. During the Second World War, he initially held a position at his alma mater, then moved to RIKEN, where he became assistant to Yoshio Nishina.

After the end of the war, he co-founded "Science of Thought" with Shunsuke Tsurumi and others. Afterwards, as a member of the Science of Thought Research Group, he published many papers in fields such as the history of science and theory of technology. He also actively spoke out on nuclear issues, criticizing America's hydrogen bomb tests, while affirming the possession of nuclear weapons by socialist countries.

In 1952, Taketani became a professor at Rikkyō University, a position he held until 1969. In 1972, he established the Nuclear Safety Issues Research Group, and in 1976, when the Nuclear Data and Information Office was launched, he became its representative.

== Doctrine of the Three Stages of Scientific Development ==
Taketani applied Hegel's theory of dialectics, with the triad Phenomenon, Substance, and Essence. Having worked with Yukawa as he developed his discovery of the meson, he used this as an example of a new substance. With his fellow peer and collaborator Shoichi Sakata, Taketani developed a Marxist philosophy of science known as the three-stages theory. According to the theory, science starts from a Phenomenal Stage where its role is to describe our experience. Next, science then asks what sort of substance may make up the objects of experience, and also what is the structure they may have, which he calls the Substantial Stage. However, he then argues the question of an essence of both substance and phenomenon emerges as the Essential Stage, which syntheses of the previous two stages. The process is then reiterated with a similar cycle repeated at a higher level.
