= ToFeT =

ToFeT is a kinetic Monte Carlo electronic model of molecular films, able to simulate the time-of-flight experiment (ToF), field-effect transistors (FeTs). As its input, ToFeT takes a description of the film at a molecular level: a description of the position of all molecules and the interactions between them. As its output, ToFeT produces electrical characteristics such as mobilities, JV curves, and transient photocurrents. ToFeT thus allows the microscopic properties of a film to be related to its macroscopic electronic properties.

ToFeT is an open-source project, used by academic and industrial groups around the world. The current focus in ToFeT's development is to treat a wider range of materials systems, and reproduce a wider range of experimental measurements.

In Hebrew, the word "Tofet" stands for "inferno, scene of horror; hell", thus providing a fitting indication to the complexity of the module.
