= Radio Tip Top =

BBC Radio 1 comedy programme

Radio Tip Top is a BBC Radio 1 comedy programme broadcast from 1995 to 1996. Produced by the Tip Top Organisation (co-founded by Nigel Proktor), the show was a retro take on 1960s broadcasting, presented by The Ginger Prince (Nigel Proktor) and Kid Tempo (Eli Hourd). The program encouraged listener interaction and offered free membership to Club Tip Top, which also sold numerous items of merchandise.

The tag line to the show was "If it ain't tip-top, then it ain't Tip Top".

One of the features of the show was a live performance from the Starlight Rooms hosted by The Ginger Prince, which featured a band called Blinder, whose lead singer was called Knocker. They performed various covers of songs around at the time.

Prior to BBC Radio 1 it was a pirate radio station broadcasting on a Wednesday night to the London area. This started broadcasting in 1993 up until it was closed down and moved to the BBC.

The show raised money for a guide dog from listeners' contributions. It was named Technotronic, and a party was held in London which listeners could attend. According to the presenters, the station's transmission was powered by "Lunewyre technology in total Spectrasound". In later episodes this was upgraded to "Lunewyre technology Plus—with lasers, for improved total Spectrasound".

Listeners were encouraged to become members of the Tip Top Club and were issued with individual membership numbers.

Characters on the show included Postman Patois, a reggae loving mailman who ended his segments with the advice: "Don't, don't don't....forget your postcode." Also featured was 'Norman Barrington', a spoof of the real DJ who was heard on Radio Caroline during the first half of the 1970s. (No request was ever made for permission for the use of his real name).

Tip Top also released a single, a cover of M's "Pop Muzik". It was backed with a humorous take on Babylon Zoo's "Spaceman", performed by the above-mentioned Blinder, with singer Knocker on helium.

A pilot TV show, Tip Top TV, was produced, but this never went to series. The pilot featured Kid Tempo and the Ginger Prince (Hourd and Proktor) plus the "Lunewyre Technology" girls - Stellar, Astra, Galaxy and Nova - with musical guests Let Loose and Eternal, plus an all-girl dance group called Girls Today.
