= Twisted sector =

Special collection of states in closed string theory

In theoretical physics, a twisted sector is a configuration of sectors in orbifold conformal field theories.

In the first quantized formalism of string theory (or in two-dimensional conformal field theory) the target space is an orbifold M/G if the observables of the string are only defined modulo G. Consequently, the value of the field after one cycle around the closed string need only be the same as its original value modulo some G transformation.

i.e. there exists some $g\in G$ such that

$$X(\sigma+2\pi,\tau)=g[X(\sigma,\tau)]$$

For each conjugacy class of G, we have a different superselection sector (wrt the worldsheet). The conjugacy class consisting of the identity gives rise to the untwisted sector and all the other conjugacy classes give rise to twisted sectors. It's easy to see that since the observables are only modulo G, two different g's which are conjugate to each other give rise to the same sector.

In the second quantized formalism, the different sectors give rise to different orbifold projections.

== See also ==
- Orbifold cohomology
