= Tidal diamond =

Symbol used in British naval charts

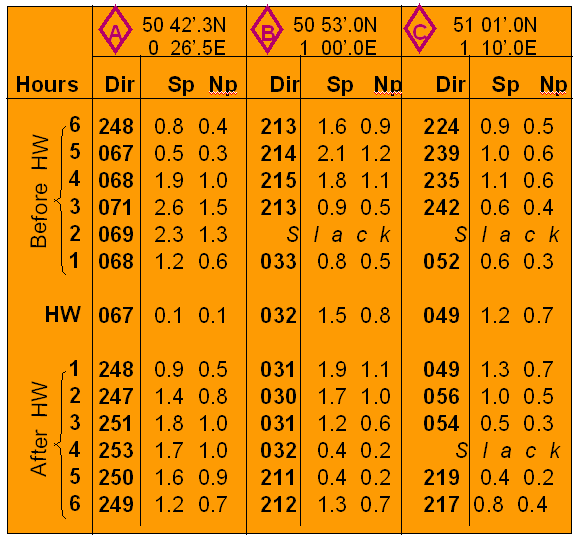
A tidal diamond table

Tidal diamonds are symbols on British admiralty charts and others (Note: For instance those published by Imray Laurie Norie & Wilson for small vessels) that indicate the direction and speed of tidal streams.

The symbols consist of a letter of the ISO basic Latin alphabet in a rhombus, printed in purple ink. (Note: Older (pre-1967) charts may use black ink) On any particular chart each tidal diamond will have a unique letter starting from "A" and continuing alphabetically.

Either somewhere on the chart (generally on land) or else on a separate sheet, will be a Tidal Diamond table. This contains a grid of thirteen rows and three columns for each Diamond. The rows are the hours of the tidal cycle showing the 6 hours before high water, high water itself and the 6 hours after high water. It is important to realise that the tidal hour lasts from half an hour before the nominal time to half an hour after. For instance the row for 3 hours after high water is valid from HW+2½ to HW+3½, not from HW+3 to HW+4. The columns show the bearing of the tidal stream and its speed, in knots, at both spring tide and neap tide. The times on the table are related to the high water of the standard port displayed on the table. To calculate the rate at an intermediate tide between neap and spring, interpolation is required. Traditionally this has been done using a "calculation of rates" chart.

An alternative to a tidal diamond is a tidal atlas which are often more accurate and easier to use (if available).

== Citations ==
- Noice, Alison (2015). Yachtmaster for sail & power: a manual for the RYA yachtmaster certificates of competence. ISBN 978-1-4729-2549-7.
- Royal Yachting Association (Great Britain) (2016). Rya yachtmaster shorebased notes. Royal Yachting Association. ISBN 978-1-906435-92-9.
- United Kingdom Hydrographic Office (2016). Symbols and abbreviations used on admiralty paper charts (Edition 6 ed.). Taunton, Somerset: United Kingdom Hydrographic Office. ISBN 978-0-7077-4174-1.
