= Trisonic Wind Tunnel =

United States wind tunnel

A Trisonic Wind Tunnel (TWT) is a wind tunnel so named because it is capable of testing in three speed regimes – subsonic, transonic, and supersonic. The earliest known trisonic wind tunnel was dated to 1950 and was located in El Segundo, California before it closed in 2007. Other trisonic wind tunnels currently in operation are those located at NASA's Marshall Space Flight Center, National Researach Council Canada's 1.5 m Trisonic Wind Tunnel Research Facility and the French-German Research Institute of Saint-Louis, ISRO's Vikram Sarabhai Space Centre (VSSC) in Thiruvananthapuram, and 1.2m Trisonic Wind Tunnel Facility at National Aerospace Laboratories.

== El Segundo Trisonic Wind Tunnel ==
The El Segundo Trisonic Wind Tunnel or North American Trisonic Wind Tunnel (NATWT) was a wind tunnel that was located in El Segundo, California. It was built by North American Aviation in the 1950s. The tunnel had a maximum testing speed of Mach 3.5.

The NATWT was a blow-down type tunnel. In contrast to a continuous wind tunnel, a blow-down wind tunnel only provides air for short period. A continuous wind tunnel is driven by large fans and typically is only capable of subsonic speeds. Because a blow-down tunnel can build up pressure over a long period time, it can release air at faster speeds.

The NATWT used two Westinghouse motors, totaling 10,000 hp and consuming 8 megawatts of electricity, that drove two compressors. NATWT had its own substation to supply its high electrical demand. During the hot summer season, NATWT ran on a night schedule to balance its load with public air conditioning.

The compressors pressurized eight large spheres totaling 214,000 cubic feet (6,100 m^{3}). These spheres were connected to a single manifold that connected to a valve mechanism. When the valve was opened, the compressed air passed through the settling chamber, nozzle, and the test section, where instrumented aerodynamic models were mounted. A diffusing area that expanded in size slowed the air before it was exhausted vertically into the atmosphere. The diffuser area included a colander-like sieve made of 1-inch-thick (25 mm) steel to catch debris in the event of a catastrophic model failure.

The speed of the air was determined by the pressure of the spheres and the cross sectional area of the wind tunnel nozzle and diffuser. A smaller cross section in the nozzle caused the air to move faster. The NATWT could change the shape of the nozzle by operating a series of hydraulic pistons that would bend one-inch thick steel plates into the desired contour.

A distinguishing feature of the NATWT was the size of its test section [7 by 7 feet (2.1 m × 2.1 m)]. Unlike most blow-down wind tunnels, the NATWT test section had a so-called "walk in" test section that could accommodate very large aerodynamic models. Large models have several advantages:

- ability to model relatively small features, such as vortex generators
- ability to instrument the model with more pressure probes and sensors
- more surface area enabling more pressure sensors
- more interior space for instrumentation

Because of the "walk in" nature of NATWT, the tunnel was designed with the possibility that someone could accidentally be locked in the tunnel. Two large emergency safety switches were provided. One was located at the test section, the other at the diffuser area. When either of these safety switches were activated, the valve could not be opened.

Another feature of NATWT was the ability to visualize airflow over a model surface. By using optics built into the test section, an engineer could view air disturbance patterns as they were occurring during a test.

=== History ===
When Rockwell International purchased North American Aviation, it also gained ownership of the NATWT. The NATWT was then gifted to the University of California, Los Angeles (UCLA) in 1998, with the intention of NATWT becoming a university research facility. It became known as the Micro Craft Trisonic Wind Tunnel. In 2007, UCLA decided to close the trisonic wind tunnel, citing environmental issues.

The last test to be conducted at TWT was completed on August 28, 2007. It was designated as test TWT 807. TWT was demolished in 2009.

== Sources ==
- El Segundo Wind Tunnel, 9/2007
