= Tideline =

Where two ocean currents converge

A tideline refers to where two currents in the ocean converge. Driftwood, floating seaweed, foam, and other floating debris may accumulate, forming sinuous lines called tidelines (although they generally have nothing to do with the tide).

There are four mechanisms that can cause tidelines to form:

1. Where one body of water is sinking beneath or riding over top of the surface layer of another body of water (somewhat similar in mechanics to subduction and/or uprisal of the earth plates at continental margins). These types of tidelines are often found where rivers enter the ocean.
2. Along the margins of back-eddies.
3. Convergence zones associated with internal gravity waves.
4. Along adjacent cells formed by wind currents.

== See also ==
- Langmuir circulation
- Ocean circulation
- Flotsam and jetsam
