= The Meaning of It All =

1998 book by Richard Feynman

- First edition cover
- Author: Richard Feynman
- Language: English
- Subject: Philosophy of science
- Genre: Non-fiction
- Publisher: Addison-Wesley
- Publication date: 1998
- Publication place: United States
- Media type: Print (hardcover)
- Pages: 133
- ISBN: 0-201-36080-2

The Meaning of It All: Thoughts of a Citizen Scientist is a non-fiction book by the Nobel Prize-winning physicist Richard Feynman. It is a collection of three previously unpublished public lectures given by Feynman in 1963. The book was first published in hardcover in 1998, ten years after Feynman's death, by Addison–Wesley. Several paperback and audiobook editions of the book have subsequently been published.

The Meaning of It All is non-technical book in which Feynman investigates the relationship between science and society.

== Background ==
The Meaning of It All contains three public lectures Richard Feynman gave on the theme "A Scientist Looks at Society" during the John Danz Lecture Series at the University of Washington, Seattle in April 1963. At the time Feynman was already a highly respected physicist who played a big role in laying the groundwork for modern particle physics. Two years later in 1965, Feynman won the Nobel Prize in Physics with Julian Schwinger and Sin-Itiro Tomonaga for their work in quantum electrodynamics.

The three lectures were not published at the time, because, despite requests by the University of Washington Press, Feynman did not want them to be printed. The Meaning of It All was published posthumously by Addison–Wesley in 1998, with the lectures having been transcribed "verbatim" from audio recordings.

Apart from numerous scientific papers, Feynman also published The Feynman Lectures on Physics in 1964, which was based on lectures he had given to undergraduate students between 1961 and 1963. Towards the end of his life, he edited two autobiographical books, Surely You're Joking, Mr. Feynman! and What Do You Care What Other People Think?, published in 1985 and 1988 respectively.

== Synopsis ==
In the first lecture, "The Uncertainty of Science" Feynman explains the nature of science, that it is a "method for finding things out", and that it is "based on the principle that observation is the judge of whether something is so or not". He says that uncertainty and doubt in science are a good thing, because it always keeps the door open for further investigation. The lecture is structured around three topics: the activity of "doing" science, the body of scientific knowledge, and the application of science, which Feynman covers in reverse order. Feynman also emphasizes the distinction between questions that science can answer: "what will happen", and questions science cannot answer: "what do I want to happen".

The second lecture, "The Uncertainty of Values" deals with his views on the relationship between science, religion and politics. Feynman acknowledges science's limitations and says that it does not have the value system that religions have, but adds that it can be used to help in making decisions. He also stresses the importance of having the freedom to question and explore, and criticizes the (then) Soviet Union by saying that no government has the right to decide which scientific principles are correct and which are not.

In the third lecture, "This Unscientific Age", the longest of the three, Feynman discusses his views on modern society and how unscientific it is. Using a number of anecdotes as examples, he covers a range of topics, including "faith healing, flying saucers, politics, psychic phenomena, TV commercials, and desert real estate".

== Reception ==
The Meaning of It All was generally well received by reviewers, although some said that the lectures did not translate into print very well and complained about the awkward sentence constructions in places resulting from the transcription from the audio recordings.

In The Guardian Nicholas Lezard wrote that The Meaning of It All has almost no science in it, and that Feynman, two years before winning the Nobel Prize in Physics, gave these lectures to a non-specialist audience and spoke of "the principles of scientific methodology as if he was making a good wedding speech". Bruce Tierney said on the Book Page that it gives readers "the opportunity to take a fresh glimpse into the inner workings of one of the finest minds of our age", adding that Feynman "expounds on [...] issues with his characteristic energy and intellectual vigor".

Nick Meyer wrote in the New York magazine that Feynman departs from his field of theoretical physics and "waxes philosophical" on "the strengths and limitations of scientific thought", using topics like "poverty, religion, and flying saucers" to illustrate his arguments. Meyer said that Feynman "sounds like himself, which is a high compliment." Chris Quigg, a theoretical physicist at the Fermi National Accelerator Laboratory, said that The Meaning of It All is an opportunity to "ponder and debate [Feynman's] ideas". Quigg said it is also an "unspoken challenge" to other scientists to consider the "cultural and spiritual value of science".

Timothy Ferris writing in The New York Times was generally impressed with the first two lectures, but felt that Feynman's "ad-lib approach" faltered in the third. At the beginning of this last lecture Feynman said, "I have completely run out of organized ideas", and Ferris felt that this showed in the somewhat "ragged" speech that followed. Eli Kintish in The Yale Review of Books complained that while the lectures "burn with the fuel of Feynman's enthusiasm", they are difficult to follow in places because of their lack of focus. Kintish said that with some editing it would have been "a more accessible read", but added that the book was still full of "original gems". David Goodstein, a physicist who attended the lectures in 1963, wrote in American Scientist that while the book has "some nuggets of pure Feynman gold", it is "badly dated and atrociously edited". Goodstein complained that the publishers had ignored Feynman's request not to print the lectures, and said that the book "does not honor his memory".
