= The Radiation Belt and Magnetosphere =

Book by Wilmot N. Hess

- Author: Wilmot Hess
- Publication date: 1968

The Radiation Belt and Magnetosphere is a book written by Wilmot Hess in 1968. The intention of the book is to amalgamate and sift through some 2500 articles, written since 1960, on this topic.

== See also ==
- Magnetosphere
- Van Allen radiation belt
