= Standard port =

A standard port is a port whose tidal predictions are directly given in the tide tables.

Tide predictions for standard ports are based on continuous observation of tides over a period of at least one year. The predictions are given in feet or meters, with respect to the chart datum for average meteorological conditions. Some examples of primary ports are Bhavnagar, Bombay, Cochin, Manila, Karachi, Singapore, Suez, and Port Dickson. Standard ports are marked in bold letters in the Index pages of Admiralty Tide Tables (or Tidal Almanacs). Tidal predictions are usually made by the Bureau of Meteorology of that country.

Secondary ports (also called secondary place in some countries like Australia), on the other hand, are ports for which tides have to be calculated based on a primary port with a similar tidal curve. Examples of secondary ports are Rabigh, Porto Novo, Porbandar, Port Cornwallis, Sharjah, and The Sandheads (Hugli).
