= Timothy Hampton =

Specialist in weapons of mass destruction

Timothy Hampton (1962–2009) was a specialist in weapons of mass destruction and an employee of the preparatory commission for the Comprehensive Nuclear-Test-Ban Treaty Organization (CTBTO) in Vienna, Austria since 1998.

== Death ==
Hampton died in an apparent fall from the 17th floor of his workplace, Building E, at the Vienna International Centre in Vienna, Austria. According to a United Nations spokesman, he was found dead at the bottom of an internal stairwell at around 8.00 am on Tuesday, 20 October 2009. Hampton was trained as a biochemist and had worked with David Kelly, the director of microbiology at Porton Down, Britain's Defence Science and Technology Laboratory, before moving onto nuclear test-ban projects. Hampton is survived by his partner, Olena Gryshcuk and a 3-year-old child. Gryshcuk is reported to be a weapons inspector for the International Atomic Energy Agency (IAEA).

An initial autopsy concluded that there were no suspicious circumstances, however a second post-mortem examination, performed by pathologist Professor Kathrin Yen, on behalf of the family, detected internal bruising caused by strangulation and concluded these were not consistent with suicide. Yen later withdrew her conclusions, describing them as a misunderstanding

== Alleged North Korean nuclear test anomaly ==
In September 2009, an article appeared in the CBTO Newsletter, Spectrum. The piece was co-authored by Hampton, and he is recognized as part of a team maintaining CBTO software which analyses International Monitoring System data. The article suggests that data collected from a DPRK announced nuclear test on 25 May 2009, did not exhibit the radionuclide emission signature that might be expected from the seismic event observed. The article is careful to defer to CBTO Member States as the final arbiter of the origin of these events, but the conclusion from the data is clear: Either emissions from the 4-kiloton event were contained at an unlikely level of > 99.9%, or the event was a non-nuclear, man-made explosion.
