= Turbulent jet breakup =

Turbulent jet breakup is the phenomena of the disintegration of a liquid/gas jet due to turbulent forces acting either on the surface of the jet or present within the jet itself. Turbulent jet breakup is mainly caused by an interplay of aerodynamic forces (e.g. drag acting on the jet surface) and/or by the internal turbulence forces within the jet (e.g. cavitation, eddies) itself.

Understanding the physics of the breakup of turbulent liquid jets is important for a variety of applications including fuel injection, fire suppression systems, and water jet cutting.
