= Trygve Røed-Larsen =

Norwegian physicist

Trygve Røed-Larsen (born 17 May 1939) is a Norwegian physicist.

He graduated with the cand.real. degree in physics, and took the dr.philos. degree at the University of Oslo in 1973. He spent his professional career at the Norwegian Defence Research Establishment and Det Norske Veritas, and was also a delegate to AGARD. He has over 100 academic publications, and is a member of the Norwegian Academy of Technological Sciences.

He resides in Høvik.
