= Ehrenfest–Tolman effect =

Theory of temperature in general relativity

In general relativity, the Ehrenfest–Tolman effect (also known as the Tolman–Ehrenfest effect), named after Richard C. Tolman and Paul Ehrenfest, argues that temperature is not constant in space at thermal equilibrium, but varies with the spacetime curvature. Specifically, it depends on the spacetime metric. In a stationary spacetime with timelike Killing vector field $\xi$, the temperature $T$ satisfies instead the Tolman–Ehrenfest relation: $T\,||\xi||=\mathrm{constant}$, where $||\xi||=\sqrt{g_{ab}\xi^a\xi^b}$ is the norm of the timelike Killing vector field. The effect was described by Tolman and Ehrenfest in 1930.

This relationship leads to the concept of thermal time which has been considered as a possible basis for a fully general-relativistic thermodynamics. It has been shown that the Tolman–Ehrenfest effect can be derived by applying the equivalence principle to the concept that temperature is the rate of thermal time with respect to proper time.
