= Monkey and hunter =

Simple physics model illustrating free fall

The curves correspond to the trajectories of darts fired at different speeds. Monkeys and darts of the same colour correspond to their positions at the same moment in time. In the SVG file, hover over a monkey or dart to highlight those contemporaneous with it. Note that monkey and darts remain in a line parallel to the line connecting their initial positions.

In physics, the monkey and hunter is a hypothetical scenario often used to illustrate the effect of gravity on projectile motion. It can be presented as exercise problem or as a demonstration.

The essentials of the problem are stated in many introductory guides to physics. In essence, the problem is as follows:

A hunter with a blowgun goes out in the woods to hunt for monkeys and sees one hanging in a tree. The monkey releases its grip the instant the hunter fires his blowgun. Where should the hunter aim in order to hit the monkey?

== Discussion ==
All objects fall at the same rate, about 9.8 metres per second per second near the Earth's surface, regardless of the object's weight. Furthermore, horizontal motions and vertical motions are independent: gravity acts only upon an object's vertical velocity, not upon its velocity in the horizontal direction. The hunter's dart, therefore, falls with the same acceleration as the monkey.

Assume for the moment that gravity was not at work. In that case, the dart would proceed in a straight-line trajectory at a constant speed (Newton's first law). Gravity causes the dart to fall away from this straight-line path, making a trajectory that is in fact a parabola. Now, consider what happens if the hunter aims directly at the monkey, and the monkey releases his grip the instant the hunter fires. Because the force of gravity accelerates the dart and the monkey equally, they fall the same distance in the same time: the monkey falls from the tree branch, and the dart falls the same distance from the straight-line path it would have taken in the absence of gravity. Therefore, the dart will always hit the monkey, no matter the initial speed of the dart, no matter the acceleration of gravity.

Another way of looking at the problem is by a transformation of the reference frame. Earlier the problem was stated in a reference frame in which the Earth is motionless. However, for very small distances on the surface of Earth the acceleration due to gravity can be considered constant to good approximation. Therefore, the same acceleration g acts upon both the dart and the monkey throughout the fall. Transform the reference frame to one that is accelerated upward by the amount g with respect to the Earth's reference frame (which is to say the acceleration of the new frame with respect to the Earth is −g). Because of Galilean equivalence, the (approximately) constant gravitational field (approximately) disappears, leaving us with only the horizontal velocity of both the dart and the monkey.

In this reference frame the hunter should aim straight at the monkey, since the monkey is stationary. Since angles are invariant under transformations of reference frames, transforming back to the Earth's reference frame the result is still that the hunter should aim straight at the monkey. While this approach has the advantage of making the results intuitively obvious, it suffers from the slight logical blemish that the laws of classical mechanics are not postulated within the theory to be invariant under transformations to non-inertial (accelerated) reference frames (see also principle of relativity).
