= Timothy Schrabback =

Tim Richard Walter Schrabback–Krahe is KIPAC Fellow at the Kavli Institute of Particle Astrophysics and Cosmology, which is based at Stanford University. He is working within the X-ray Astronomy and Observational Cosmology Group. His research focuses on weak gravitational lensing and its applications for cosmology and astrophysics.

- CFHTLens
- Euclid
- The MAD Cluster Survey

Working within the Leiden Observatory, he led a team of scientists conducting an intensive study of over 446 000 galaxies within the COSMOS survey field, the result of the largest survey ever conducted with Hubble, showing independent confirmation that the expansion of the Universe is accelerated by an additional, mysterious component named dark energy. A handful of other such independent confirmations exist.

== See also ==
Accelerating expansion of the cosmos

dark matter

Calán/Tololo Survey
