= Transport length =

Measurement of photon propagation

The transport length in a strongly diffusing medium (noted l*) is the length over which the direction of propagation of the photon is randomized. It is related to the mean free path l by the relation:

$l^*=\frac{l}{1-g}$

with g: the asymmetry coefficient. $g= \langle cos (\theta) \rangle$ or averaging of the scattering angle θ over a high number of scattering events.

g can be evaluated with the Mie theory.
If g=0, l=l*. A single scattering is already isotropic.
If g→1, l*→infinite. A single scattering doesn't deviate the photons. Then the scattering never gets isotropic.

This length is useful for renormalizing a non-isotropic scattering problem into an isotropic one in order to use classical diffusion laws (Fick law and Brownian motion). The transport length might be measured by transmission experiments and backscattering experiments.

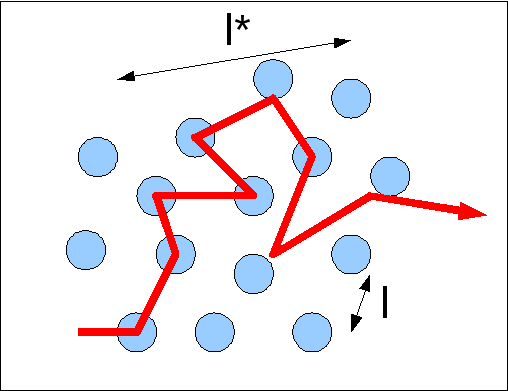
Mean free path simple scheme
