= The Internet Pilot to Physics =

Historical website

TIPTOP (fully known as The Internet Pilot to Physics) was a web site operated in collaboration between Kenneth Bodin-Holmlund at Umeå University, Mikko Karttunen at McGill University and Guenther Nowotny at the Technical University of Vienna during 1994–1998, and it was originally derived from Physics Around the World (PAW) that was initiated by Karttunen at McGill University.

In a historical perspective, PAW was one of the first web directories, listing various physics related resources. TIPTOP utilized (at the time) new technologies to handle a news system, a job database, a conference database, and an improved web directory for physics. TIPTOP was the first major site to use PHP with mySQL, today a highly popular combination. Already in 1995, TIPTOP also had one of the first embryos of a wiki, called the Living Encyclopedia of Physics, that offered community based-editing, an editorial system and peer review, as well as automatic cross linking.
