= Tachyon (disambiguation) =

A tachyon is a hypothetical faster-than-light particle.

Tachyon or tachyonic may also refer to:

- Tachyonic field or tachyon, a field excitation with imaginary mass
- Tachyon (software), ray-tracing software
- Tachyon: The Fringe, a 2000 computer game
- Tachyon Publications, a US book publisher

== See also ==
- Tachyons in fiction
- Tachyon condensation, a process in physics
- Tachyonic antitelephone, a hypothetical communication device
- Agnes Tachyon, a Japanese racehorse
- Takyon (Death Yon), a song by Death Grips
- Tachyon net, a device in the Dune universe
- Tachyon Flyer, a spaceship in the Star Wars universe
- Emperor Percival Tachyon, a Ratchet & Clank character
- Team Tachyon, a department of Tecmo Koei
