= Faster-than-light communication =

Information sent faster than light

Faster-than-light communication, also called superluminal communication, is a hypothetical process in which information is conveyed at faster-than-light speeds. The current scientific consensus is that faster-than-light communication is not possible, and to date it has not been achieved in any experiment.

Faster-than-light communication other than possibly through wormholes is likely impossible because, in a Lorentz-invariant theory, it could be used to transmit information into the past. This would complicate causality, but no theoretical arguments conclusively preclude this possibility.

A number of theories and phenomena related to faster-than-light communication have been proposed or studied, including tachyons, neutrinos, quantum nonlocality, wormholes, quantum entanglement and quantum tunneling.

== Proposed mechanisms ==
Spacetime diagram showing that moving faster than light implies time travel in the context of special relativity. A spaceship departs from Earth from A to C slower than light. At B, Earth emits a tachyon, particle that travels faster than light but forward in time in Earth's reference frame. It reaches the spaceship at C. The spaceship then sends another tachyon back to Earth from C to D. This tachyon also travels forward in time in the spaceship's reference frame. This effectively allows Earth to send a signal from B to D, back in time.

=== Tachyons ===
Tachyonic particles are hypothetical particles that travel faster than light, which could conceivably allow for superluminal communication. Because such a particle would violate the known laws of physics, many scientists reject the idea that they exist. By contrast, tachyonic fields – quantum fields with imaginary mass – do exist and exhibit superluminal group velocity under some circumstances. However, such fields have luminal signal velocity and do not allow superluminal communication.

=== Quantum nonlocality ===
Quantum mechanics is non-local in the sense that distant systems can be entangled. Entangled states lead to correlations in the results of otherwise random measurements, even when the measurements are made nearly simultaneously and at far distant points. The impossibility of superluminal communication led Einstein, Podolsky, and Rosen to propose that quantum mechanics must be incomplete (see EPR paradox).

However, it is now well understood that quantum entanglement does not allow any influence or information to propagate superluminally.

Practically, any attempt to force one member of an entangled pair of particles into a particular quantum state, breaks the entanglement between the two particles. That is to say, the other member of the entangled pair is completely unaffected by this "forcing" action, and its quantum state remains random; a preferred outcome cannot be encoded into a quantum measurement.

Technically, the microscopic causality postulate of axiomatic quantum field theory implies the impossibility of superluminal communication using any phenomena whose behavior can be described by orthodox quantum field theory. A special case of this is the no-communication theorem, which prevents communication using the quantum entanglement of a composite system shared between two spacelike-separated observers.

=== Wormholes ===
If wormholes are possible, then ordinary subluminal methods of communication could be sent through them to achieve effectively superluminal transmission speeds across non-local regions of spacetime. Considering the immense energy or exotic matter with negative mass/negative energy that current theories suggest would be required to open a wormhole large enough to pass spacecraft through, it may be that only atomic-scale wormholes would be practical to build, limiting their use solely to information transmission. Some hypotheses of wormhole formation would prevent them from ever becoming "timeholes", allowing superluminal communication without the additional complication of allowing communication with the past.

== Fictional devices ==
=== Tachyon-like ===
The Dirac communicator features in several of the works of James Blish, notably his 1954 short story "Beep" (later expanded into The Quincunx of Time). As alluded to in the title, any active device received the sum of all transmitted messages in universal space-time, in a single pulse, so that demultiplexing yielded information about the past, present, and future.

=== Superluminal transmitters and ansibles ===
The terms "ultrawave" and "hyperwave" have been used by several authors, often interchangeably, to denote faster-than-light communications. Examples include:

- E. E. Smith used the term "ultrawave" in his Lensman series, for waves which propagated through a sub-ether and could be used for weapons, communications, and other applications.
- In Isaac Asimov's Foundation series, "ultrawave" and "hyperwave" are used interchangeably to represent a superluminal communications medium. The hyperwave relay also features.
- In the Star Trek universe, subspace carries faster-than-light communication (subspace radio) and travel (warp drive).
- The Cities in Flight series by James Blish featured ultrawave communications which used the known phenomenon of phase velocity to carry information, a property which in fact is impossible. The limitations of phase velocity beyond the speed of light later led him to develop his Dirac communicator.
- Larry Niven used hyperwave in his Known Space series as the term for a faster-than-light method of communication. Unlike the hyperdrive that moved ships at a finite superluminal speed, hyperwave was essentially instantaneous.
- In Richard K. Morgan's Takeshi Kovacs novels human colonies on distant planets maintain contact with earth and each other via hyperspatial needlecast, a technology which moves information "...so close to instantaneously that scientists are still arguing about the terminology".

A later device was the ansible coined by Ursula K. Le Guin and used extensively in her Hainish Cycle. Like Blish's device it provided instantaneous communication, but without the inconvenient beep.

The ansible is also a major plot element, nearly a MacGuffin, in Elizabeth Moon's Vatta's War series. Much of the story line revolves around various parties attacking or repairing ansibles, and around the internal politics of ISC (InterStellar Communications), a corporation which holds a monopoly on the ansible technology.

The ansible is also used as the main form of communication in Orson Scott Card's Ender's Game series. It is inhabited by an energy based, non-artificial sentient creature called an Aiúa that was placed within the ansible network and goes by the name of Jane. It was made when the humans realized that the Buggers, an alien species that attacked Earth, could communicate instantaneously and so the humans tried to do the same.

=== Quantum entanglement ===
- In Ernest Cline's novel Armada, alien invaders possess technology for instant "quantum communication" with unlimited range. Humans reverse engineer the device from captured alien technology.
- In the Mass Effect series of video games, instantaneous communication is possible using quantum-entanglement communicators placed in the communications rooms of starships.
- In the Avatar continuity, faster-than-light communication via a subtle control over the state of entangled particles is possible, but for practical purposes extremely slow and expensive: at a transmission rate of three bits of information per hour and a cost of $7,500 per bit, it is used for only the highest priority messages.
- Charles Stross's books Singularity Sky and Iron Sunrise make use of "causal channels" which use entangled particles for instantaneous two-way communication. The technique has drawbacks in that the entangled particles are expendable and the use of faster-than-light travel destroys the entanglement, so that one end of the channel must be transported below light speed. This makes them expensive and limits their usefulness somewhat.
- In Liu Cixin's novel The Three-Body Problem, the alien Trisolarans, while preparing to invade the Solar System, use a device with Ansible characteristics to communicate with their collaborators on Earth in real time. Additionally, they use spying/sabotaging devices called 'Sophons' on Earth which by penetration can access any kind of electronically saved and visual information, interact with electronics, and communicate results back to Trisolaris in real-time via quantum entanglement. The technology used is "single protons that have been unfolded from eleven space dimensions to two dimensions, programmed, and then refolded" and thus Sophons remain undetectable for humans.
- In John Schettler's Earthforce Series evolution within his Kirov Series, "Hyperlight Modules" are used to convey the altered states of entangled particles over any distance instantaneously after a breakthrough that solves and voids the "No Communication Theorem." This permits something as simple as a Morse code message to be sent via "spooky action at a distance."

=== Psychic links ===
Psychic links, belonging to pseudoscience, have been described as explainable by physical principles or unexplained, but they are claimed to operate instantaneously over large distances.

In the Stargate television series, characters are able to communicate instantaneously over long distances by transferring their consciousness into another person or being anywhere in the universe using "Ancient communication stones". It is not known how these stones operate, but the technology explained in the show usually revolves around wormholes for instant teleportation, faster-than-light, space-warping travel, and sometimes around quantum multiverses.

In Robert A. Heinlein's Time for the Stars, twin telepathy was used to maintain communication with a distant spaceship.

Peter F. Hamilton's Void Trilogy features psychic links between the multiple bodies simultaneously occupied by some characters.

In Brandon Sanderson's Skyward series, characters are able to use "Cytonics" to communicate instantaneously over any distance by sending messages via an inter-dimensional reality called "nowhere".

=== Other devices ===
Similar devices are present in the works of numerous others, such as Frank Herbert and Philip Pullman, who called his a lodestone resonator.

Anne McCaffrey's Crystal Singer series posited an instantaneous communication device powered by rare "Black Crystal" from the planet Ballybran. Black Crystals cut from the same mineral deposit could be "tuned" to sympathetically vibrate with each other instantly, even when separated by interstellar distances, allowing instantaneous telephone-like voice and data communication. Similarly, in Gregory Keyes' series The Age of Unreason, "aetherschreibers" use two-halves of a single "chime" to communicate, aided by scientific alchemy. While the speed of communication is important, so is the fact that the messages cannot be overheard except by listeners with a piece of the same original crystal.

Stephen R. Donaldson, in his Gap cycle, proposed a similar system, Symbiotic Crystalline Resonance Transmission, clearly ansible-type technology but very difficult to produce and limited to text messages.

In "With Folded Hands" (1947) and The Humanoids (1949), by Jack Williamson, instant communication and power transfer through interstellar space is possible with rhodomagnetic energy.

In Ivan Yefremov's 1957 novel Andromeda Nebula, a device for instant transfer of information and matter is made real by using "bipolar mathematics" to explore use of anti-gravitational shadow vectors through a zero field and the antispace, which enables them to make contact with the planet of Epsilon Tucanae.

In Edmond Hamilton's The Star Kings (1949), the discovery of an unknown form of electromagnetic radiation called sub-spectrum rays moves faster than light. The fastest of these are those of the Minus-42nd Octave, which allows for real time telestereo communication with anyone within the galaxy.

In Cordwainer Smith's Instrumentality novels and stories, interplanetary and interstellar communication is normally relayed from planet to planet, presumably at superluminal speed for each stage (at least between solar systems) but with a cumulative delay. For urgent communication there is the "instant message", which is effectively instantaneous but very expensive.

In Howard Taylor's web comic series Schlock Mercenary, superluminal communication is performed via the hypernet, a galaxy-spanning analogue to the Internet. Through the hypernet, communications and data are routed through nanoscopic wormholes, using conventional electromagnetic signals.

== See also ==
- Bell test experiments
- Delayed-choice quantum eraser
- Light
- Near and far field
- Quantum teleportation
- SETI Institute
- Synchronicity
- Wheeler–Feynman absorber theory
