= Math symbol i =

The symbol i in mathematical equations may refer to:

- Imaginary unit (i), for which i^{2} = -1
  - Imaginary number
  - Complex number
- i, an index variable in a matrix
