= Tachyonic field =

Field with an imaginary mass

In physics, a tachyonic field, or simply tachyon, is a quantum field with an imaginary mass. Although tachyonic particles (particles that move faster than light) are a purely hypothetical concept that violate a number of essential physical principles, at least one field with imaginary mass, the Higgs field, is believed to exist. Under no circumstances do any excitations of tachyonic fields ever propagate faster than light—the presence or absence of a tachyonic (imaginary) mass has no effect on the maximum velocity of signals, and so unlike faster-than-light particles there is no violation of causality. Tachyonic fields play an important role in physics and are discussed in popular books.

The term "tachyon" was coined by Gerald Feinberg in a 1967 paper that studied quantum fields with imaginary mass. Feinberg believed such fields permitted faster than light propagation, but it was soon realized that this was not the case. Instead, the imaginary mass creates an instability: any configuration in which one or more field excitations are tachyonic will spontaneously decay, and the resulting configuration contains no physical tachyons. This process is known as tachyon condensation. A famous example is the condensation of the Higgs boson in the Standard Model of particle physics.

In modern physics, all fundamental particles are regarded as localized excitations of fields. Tachyons are unusual because the instability prevents any such localized excitations from existing. Any localized perturbation, no matter how small, starts an exponentially growing cascade that strongly affects physics everywhere inside the future light cone of the perturbation.

== Interpretation ==
=== Overview of tachyonic condensation ===
Although the notion of a tachyonic imaginary mass might seem troubling because there is no classical interpretation of an imaginary mass, the mass is not quantized. Rather, the scalar field is; even for tachyonic quantum fields, the field operators at spacelike separated points still commute (or anticommute), thus preserving causality. Therefore, information still does not propagate faster than light, and solutions grow exponentially, but not superluminally (there is no violation of causality).

The "imaginary mass" really means that the system becomes unstable. The zero value field is at a local maximum rather than a local minimum of its potential energy, much like a ball at the top of a hill. A very small impulse (which will always happen due to quantum fluctuations) will lead the field to roll down with exponentially increasing amplitudes toward the local minimum. In this way, tachyon condensation drives a physical system that has reached a local limit and might naively be expected to produce physical tachyons, to an alternative stable state where no physical tachyons exist. Once the tachyonic field reaches the minimum of the potential, its quanta are not tachyons anymore but rather are ordinary particles with a positive mass-squared, such as the Higgs boson.

=== Physical interpretation of a tachyonic field and signal propagation ===
There is a simple mechanical analogy that illustrates that tachyonic fields do not propagate faster than light, why they represent instabilities, and helps explain the meaning of imaginary mass (the mass squared being negative).

Consider a long line of pendulums, all pointing straight down. The mass on the end of each pendulum is connected to the masses of its two neighbors by springs. Wiggling one of the pendulums will create two ripples that propagate in both directions down the line. As the ripple passes, each pendulum in its turn oscillates a few times about the straight down position. The speed of propagation of these ripples is determined in a simple way by the tension of the springs and the inertial mass of the pendulum weights. Formally, these parameters can be chosen so that the propagation speed is the speed of light. In the limit of an infinite density of closely spaced pendulums, this model becomes identical to a relativistic field theory, where the ripples are the analog of particles. Displacing the pendulums from pointing straight down requires positive energy, which indicates that the squared mass of those particles is positive.

Now consider an initial condition where at time t=0, all the pendulums are pointing straight up. Clearly this is unstable, but at least in classical physics one can imagine that they are so carefully balanced they will remain pointing straight up indefinitely so long as they are not perturbed. Wiggling one of the upside-down pendulums will have a very different effect from before. The speed of propagation of the effects of the wiggle is identical to what it was before, since neither the spring tension nor the inertial mass have changed. However, the effects on the pendulums affected by the perturbation are dramatically different. Those pendulums that feel the effects of the perturbation will begin to topple over, and will pick up speed exponentially. Indeed, it is easy to show that any localized perturbation kicks off an exponentially growing instability that affects everything within its future "ripple cone" (a region of size equal to time multiplied by the ripple propagation speed). In the limit of infinite pendulum density, this model is a tachyonic field theory.

== Importance in physics ==
The phenomenon of spontaneous symmetry breaking, which is closely related to tachyon condensation, plays a central part in many aspects of theoretical physics, including the Ginzburg–Landau and BCS theories of superconductivity.

Other examples include the inflaton field in certain models of cosmic inflation (such as new inflation), and the tachyon of bosonic string theory.

== Condensation ==
In quantum field theory, a tachyon is a quantum of a field—usually a scalar field—whose squared mass is negative, and is used to describe spontaneous symmetry breaking: The existence of such a field implies the instability of the field vacuum; the field is at a local maximum rather than a local minimum of its potential energy, much like a ball at the top of a hill. A very small impulse (which will always happen due to quantum fluctuations) will lead the field (ball) to roll down with exponentially increasing amplitudes: it will induce tachyon condensation. Once the tachyonic field reaches the minimum of the potential, its quanta are not tachyons any more but rather have a positive mass-squared. The Higgs boson of the Standard Model of particle physics is an example.

Technically, the squared mass is the second derivative of the effective potential. For a tachyonic field the second derivative is negative, meaning that the effective potential is at a local maximum rather than a local minimum. Therefore, this situation is unstable and the field will roll down the potential.

Because a tachyon's squared mass is negative, it formally has an imaginary mass. This is a special case of the general rule, where unstable massive particles are formally described as having a complex mass, with the real part being their mass in usual sense, and the imaginary part being the decay rate in natural units.

However, in quantum field theory, a particle (a "one-particle state") is roughly defined as a state which is constant over time; i.e., an eigenvalue of the Hamiltonian. An unstable particle is a state which is only approximately constant over time; If it exists long enough to be measured, it can be formally described as having a complex mass, with the real part of the mass greater than its imaginary part. If both parts are of the same magnitude, this is interpreted as a resonance appearing in a scattering process rather than particle, as it is considered not to exist long enough to be measured independently of the scattering process. In the case of a tachyon the real part of the mass is zero, and hence no concept of a particle can be attributed to it.

Even for tachyonic quantum fields, the field operators at space-like separated points still commute (or anticommute), thus preserving the principle of causality. For closely related reasons, the maximum velocity of signals sent with a tachyonic field is strictly bounded from above by the speed of light. Therefore, information never moves faster than light regardless of the presence or absence of tachyonic fields.

Examples for tachyonic fields are all cases of spontaneous symmetry breaking. In condensed matter physics a notable example is ferromagnetism; in particle physics the best known example is the Higgs mechanism in the Standard Model.

== Tachyons in string theory ==
In string theory, tachyons have the same interpretation as in quantum field theory. However, string theory can, at least, in principle, not only describe the physics of tachyonic fields, but also predict whether such fields appear.

Tachyonic fields indeed arise in many versions of string theory. In general, string theory states that what we see as "particles" (electrons, photons, gravitons and so forth) are actually different vibrational states of the same underlying string. The mass of the particle can be deduced from the vibrations which the string exhibits; roughly speaking, the mass depends upon the "note" which the string sounds. Tachyons frequently appear in the spectrum of permissible string states, in the sense that some states have negative mass-squared, and therefore, imaginary mass. If the tachyon appears as a vibrational mode of an open string, this signals an instability of the underlying D-brane system to which the string is attached. The system will then decay to a state of closed strings and/or stable D-branes. If the tachyon is a closed string vibrational mode, this indicates an instability in spacetime itself. Generally, it is not known (or theorized) what this system will decay to. However, if the closed string tachyon is localized around a spacetime singularity, the endpoint of the decay process will often have the singularity resolved.

== See also ==
- D-brane
- Standard-Model Extension
- Poincaré group
- Quantum tunnelling
- Tachyonic antitelephone
