= Scott Dodelson =

American physicist

- Citizenship: United States
- Education: Columbia University (B.A.), (B.S.), (Ph.D.)
- Scientific career
- Fields: Astrophysics
- Institutions: Fermi National Accelerator Laboratory; University of Chicago; Carnegie Mellon University
- Doctoral advisor: Gerald Feinberg

Scott Dodelson is an American physicist. He is a professor of physics at Carnegie Mellon University and chair of its physics department.

== Biography ==
Dodelson received his B.A., B.S., and Ph.D. from Columbia University. His thesis supervisor was Gerald Feinberg. He was a research fellow at Harvard University before moving to the Fermi National Accelerator Laboratory. He joined the University of Chicago faculty in 1998 and was professor until 2017, when he joined Carnegie Mellon University. His research has focused on the intersection of physics and cosmology and has out studies on dark matter, dark energy, and cosmological neutrinos. He has played a key role in numerous cosmological surveys, including co-chairing the Science Committee of the Dark Energy Survey.

From 2006 to 2008, Dodelson was interim director of the Fermilab Center for Particle Astrophysics. He was head of Fermilab's Theoretical Astrophysics Group from 2001 to 2006.

Dodelson is a fellow of the American Physical Society. He was managing editor of International Journal of Modern Physics D from 2004 to 2008. He is the author of the astrophysics textbook Modern Cosmology. The minor planet 148707 Dodelson is named after him.
