= Jeremy Bernstein =

American physicist (1929–2025)

- Born: December 31, 1929; Rochester, New York, U.S.
- Died: 20 April 2025 (aged 95); Manhattan, New York, U.S.
- Education: Harvard University (BA, MA, PhD)
- Scientific career
- Fields: Physics, mathematics
- Doctoral advisor: Julian Schwinger

Jeremy Bernstein (December 31, 1929 – April 20, 2025) was an American theoretical physicist and popular science writer.

== Early life ==
Bernstein's parents, Philip S. Bernstein, a Reform rabbi, and Sophie Rubin Bernstein named him after the biblical Jeremiah, the subject of his father's masters thesis. Philip's parents were immigrants from Lithuania, while Sophie was of Russian-Jewish descent. The family moved from Rochester to New York City during World War II, when his father became head of all the Jewish chaplains in the armed forces.

== Education and career ==
Bernstein studied at Harvard University, receiving his bachelor's degree in 1951, his master's in 1953, and his Ph.D. in 1955. His thesis research, on electromagnetic properties of deuterium, was supervised by Julian Schwinger. As a theoretical physicist, he worked on elementary particle physics and cosmology. A summer spent in Los Alamos led to a position at the Institute for Advanced Study. In 1962 he became a faculty member at New York University, moving to become a professor of physics at Stevens Institute of Technology in 1967, a position that he continued to hold after retirement as professor emeritus. He has held adjunct or visiting positions at the Brookhaven National Laboratory, CERN, Oxford, the University of Islamabad, and the Ecole Polytechnique.

Bernstein was involved in Project Orion, investigating the potential for nuclear pulse propulsion for use in space travel. In 2025, before his death in April, he was the last living member of the senior personnel of the project.

Bernstein died on April 20, 2025, at the age of 95.

== Popular writing ==
Bernstein was a popular science writer and profiler of scientists. He was a staff writer for The New Yorker from 1961 to 1995, authoring scores of articles. He also wrote regularly for The Atlantic Monthly, the New York Review of Books, and Scientific American, among others. Bernstein's biographical profiles of physicists, including Robert Oppenheimer, Hans Bethe, Albert Einstein, John Stewart Bell and others, were able to draw on the experiences of personal acquaintance. In 2018, Bernstein published A Bouquet of Dyson: and Other Reflections on Science and Scientists.

== Books ==
- Analytical Engine – Computers Past, Present and Future, Random House, 1964
- A Comprehensible World: On Modern Science and its Origin, Random House, 1967
- Elementary Particles and Their Currents, Freeman, 1968
- Einstein, Viking Press 1973, Penguin Books, 1976
- Experiencing Science, Basic Books, 1978
- Hans Bethe – Prophet of Energy, Basic Books, 1980
- Science Observed – Essays Out of My Mind, Basic Books, 1982
- Three Degrees Above Zero – Bell Labs in the Information Age, Scribners, 1984
- Cosmological Constants – Papers in Modern Cosmology (with Gerald Feinberg), Columbia University Press, 1986 ISBN 978-0-231-06376-0
- The Life it Brings – One Physicist's Beginnings, Ticknor and Field, Penguin, 1987 ISBN 0-89919-470-2
- Kinetic Theory in the Expanding Universe, Cambridge University Press, 1988
- Tenth Dimension: an Informal History of High Energy Physics, McGraw Hill, 1989
- Quantum Profiles conversations with physicists John Stewart Bell and John Archibald Wheeler, (and Einstein's correspondence with Michele Besso), Princeton University Press, 1991 ISBN 0-691-08725-3; second edition: 2020 ISBN 978-0-190-05686-5
- Cranks, Quarks and the Cosmos – Writings on Science, Basic Books, 1993 ISBN 978-0-465-08897-3
- A Theory of Everything (Essays), Springer, 1996
- Albert Einstein and the Frontiers of Physics, Oxford University Press, 1996
- Hitler's Uranium Club – The Secret Recordings of Farm Hall (with David C. Cassidy), American Institute of Physics, 1996
- Modern Physics (with Paul Fishbane, Stephen Gasiorowicz), Prentice Hall, 2000
- The Merely Personal: Observations on Science and Scientists, Ivan Dee, 2001
- Oppenheimer – Portrait of an Enigma, Ivan Dee, 2004 ISBN 978-1-566-63569-1
- Secrets of the Old One: Albert Einstein 1905, Copernicus Books, 2006
- Plutonium – a History of the World's Most Dangerous Element, Joseph Henry Press, 2007 ISBN 978-0-309-10296-4
- A Physicist on Wall Street and Other Essays on Science and Society, Springer, 2008 ISBN 978-0-387-76505-1
- Quantum Leaps, Belknap Press, 2009; 2011 pbk edition ISBN 978-0674060142
- A Palette of Particles, Harvard University Press, 2013 ISBN 978-0-674-07251-0
- Nuclear Weapons – What You Need to Know, Cambridge University Press, 2010 ISBN 978-0-521-88408-2
- A Chorus of Bells and Other Scientific Inquiries, World Scientific, 2014 ISBN 978-981-4578-94-3
- A Bouquet of Numbers and Other Scientific Offerings, World Scientific, 2016 ISBN 978-981-4759-76-2
- A Bouquet of Dyson and Other Reflections on Science and Scientists, World Scientific, 2018 ISBN 978-981-3231-92-4

== Media appearances ==
- To Mars by A-Bomb: The Secret History of Project Orion (BBC, 2003)
