= Tachyon condensation =

Process in particle physics

Tachyon condensation is a process in particle physics in which a system can lower its potential energy by spontaneously producing particles. The end result is a "condensate" of particles that fills the volume of the system. Tachyon condensation is closely related to second-order phase transitions.

== Technical overview ==
Tachyon condensation is a process in which a tachyonic field—usually a scalar field—with a complex mass acquires a vacuum expectation value and reaches the minimum of the potential energy. While the field is tachyonic and unstable near the local maximum of the potential, the field gets a non-negative squared mass and becomes stable near the minimum.

The appearance of tachyons is a potentially serious problem for any theory; examples of tachyonic fields amenable to condensation are all cases of spontaneous symmetry breaking. In condensed matter physics a notable example is ferromagnetism; in particle physics the best known example is the Higgs mechanism in the Standard Model that breaks the electroweak symmetry.

== Condensation evolution ==
Although the notion of a tachyonic imaginary mass might seem troubling because there is no classical interpretation of an imaginary mass, the mass is not quantized. Rather, the scalar field is; even for tachyonic quantum fields, the field operators at spacelike separated points still commute (or anticommute), thus preserving causality. Therefore, information still does not propagate faster than light, and solutions grow exponentially, but not superluminally (there is no violation of causality).

The "imaginary mass" really means that the system becomes unstable. The zero value field is at a local maximum rather than a local minimum of its potential energy, much like a ball at the top of a hill. A very small impulse (which will always happen due to quantum fluctuations) will lead the field to roll down with exponentially increasing amplitudes toward the local minimum. In this way, tachyon condensation drives a physical system that has reached a local limit and might naively be expected to produce physical tachyons, to an alternate stable state where no physical tachyons exist. Once the tachyonic field reaches the minimum of the potential, its quanta are not tachyons any more but rather are ordinary particles with a positive mass-squared, such as the Higgs boson.

== In string theory ==
In the late 1990s, Ashoke Sen conjectured that the tachyons carried by open strings attached to D-branes in string theory reflect the instability of the D-branes with respect to their complete annihilation. The total energy carried by these tachyons has been calculated in string field theory; it agrees with the total energy of the D-branes, and all other tests have confirmed Sen's conjecture as well. Tachyons therefore became an active area of interest in the early 2000s.

The character of closed-string tachyon condensation is more subtle, though the first steps towards our understanding of their fate have been made by Adams, Polchinski, and Silverstein, in the case of twisted closed string tachyons, and by Simeon Hellerman and Ian Swanson, in a wider array of cases. The fate of the closed string tachyon in the 26-dimensional bosonic string theory remains unknown, though recent progress has revealed interesting new developments.

== See also ==
- Bose–Einstein condensate – a condensation process that was experimentally observed 70 years after it was theoretically proposed.
- Gaugino condensation
