= Leon Feinberg =

American poet

Leon Feinberg

Leon Feinberg (also known as Leyb Faynberg, February 6, 1897 – January 22, 1969) was a Ukrainian-born Jewish-American Yiddish poet, writer, and journalist.

== Life ==
Feinberg was born on February 6, 1897, in Kodyma, Russian Empire.

Feinberg attended religious primary school until he was seven. He later moved to Odessa with his parents and attended a high school there. He graduated from Iglitski-Rapoport high school in 1912 at the age of fifteen. His father moved to America, and Feinberg briefly lived with his father there before returning to Russia. He entered the University of Moscow in 1915, graduating from there in 1919. He was one of the large number of Jewish students who took an officer training course for the army following the outbreak of the February Revolution, and after the October Revolution he joined the Red Guards and fought against the Whites. At one point, he was adjutant for Soviet Commissar Yan Gamarnik (brother-in-law of Hayim Nahman Bialik). In the autumn of 1919, he was captured by Anton Denikin's men, who threatened to shoot him, only to be saved by Bialik's intervention on his behalf. In November 1919, Bialik helped him leave Russia on the Ruslan and travelled to Palestine. He stayed there for a year and was a founder of the kibbutz Kiryat Anavim near Jerusalem. He then spent a year traveling the world as a sailor, and in 1921 he came to America and reunited with his father.

Feinberg's first volume of Russian poetry was published in 1914 and was influenced by symbolism. He wrote other volumes of Russian poems in 1919, 1923, and 1947. He wrote his poems under the pen name Leonid Grebniov. He began writing primarily in Yiddish after he immigrated to America, although he continued to write in Russian as well. In the 1920s, his poems combined Russian mystic revolutionary strains, American Imagism, and the Yiddish In-Zikh movement, and alternated between warm reminiscences of his pious past and a desire to help the forward march of the future. In the 1930s, he wrote proletarian poetry and remained supportive of the Soviet Union in his poems until the Hitler–Stalin Pact in 1939. He then became disillusioned with Communism and his writings became focused on his affection for the Jewish people. His volumes included Groisshtut (Metropolis) in 1928, Likht Un Broit (Light and Bread) in 1931, Khaver Leben (Comrade Life) in 1938, and Die Yorshim Fun Der Erd (The Inheritors of the Earth) in 1941.

Feinberg was a member of the editorial board of the Yiddish daily Freihet and the monthly Hamer. He often contributed to Der Tog, and from 1945 to 1955 he served as its city editor. He continued to write a column on political affairs for the paper afterwards. He wrote 15 novels, including the verse novels Der Farmishpeter Dor (The Condemned Generation) in 1954 and Der Gebentshter Dor (The Blessed Generation) in 1962 which explored the lives of two generations of Jews who were caught up in the Russian Revolution but immigrated to America and Palestine, and Der Khorever Dor (The Ruined Generation) in 1967 which explored the lives of those who stayed in the Soviet Union. English translations of his poems were published in Joseph Leftwich's The Golden Peacock in 1940 and in J. B. Cooperman's America in Yiddish Poetry in 1967.

Feinberg was awarded the Leib Hoffer Premium from Buenos Aires in 1918 and the Willie and Lisa Shore literary stipend from Mexico in 1968. He was vice-president and president of the Yiddish PEN Club, a national committeeman of the National Committee for Jewish Culture, and president and secretary of the Yiddish Writers Union. He was married to Florence Weingarten. Their children were Norman, Professor Gerald Feinberg, Mrs. Babette Inglehart, Mrs. Rita Josephson, and Mrs. Harriet Bonfeld.

Feinberg died in Lebanon Hospital in the Bronx on January 22, 1969.
