= William Newcomb =

American theoretical physicist (1927–1999)

William Newcomb (1927 – 29 May 1999) was an American theoretical physicist and professor at the University of California's Lawrence Livermore Laboratory, who is best known as the creator of Newcomb's paradox, devised in 1960. He was the great-grandnephew of the astronomer Simon Newcomb.

Newcomb started at the Lawrence Livermore National Laboratory (then University of California Radiation Laboratory), probably in 1955, in the Energy Directorate. He was also an adjunct professor in the UC Davis Livermore Department of Applied Science, starting in 1971.

At Lawrence Livermore National Laboratory, Newcomb made significant contributions to plasma physics through his pioneering work on magnetic mirrors, conceptual devices for achieving plasma confinement, a primary requirement for nuclear fusion. His two seminal publications in the field were "Gyroscopic-quasielastic fluid systems" (published in Annals of Physics in 1973) and "Equilibrium and stability of collisionless systems in the paraxial limit" (published in Journal of Plasma Physics in 1981). These works established fundamental theoretical frameworks that advanced understanding of plasma behavior in magnetic confinement systems. Newcomb, along with Gregory Benford and David Book, coined the name of the Tachyonic antitelephone, a mechanism by which one could theoretically travel, or transmit signals, to one's past self.
