= Tachyons in fiction =

Hypothetical particle

The hypothetical particles tachyons, defined through being faster than light, have inspired many occurrences in fiction. In general, tachyons are a standby mechanism upon which many science fiction authors rely to establish faster-than-light communication, with or without reference to causality issues, as well as a means to achieve faster-than-light travel. Science writer Sidney Perkowitz commented "that the very word "tachyon," because of its unusual Greek-origin spelling and engagingly catchy hard "ch" sound, lends a certain "science-ness" or "science coolness to fiction." Starting in the 1970s, tachyons were used in science-fiction to present a seemingly-plausible explanation for time travel and communication through time. Peter Nicholls, in The Encyclopedia of Science Fiction, describes Gregory Benford's Timescape (1980) as the first work to use tachyons to this effect "with some care", where scientists send a message to the past trying to change history. Glen Cook's 1985 novel A Matter of Time features a much less stringently described "tachyon generator" to "transmit [both to the past and] to the far future". Uses of the concept for space travel appeared in association with "the Asgard, the benevolent alien race in the Stargate SG-1 television series (1997–2007)", and in the 2001 film K-PAX, which coined the term "tachyonic speeds" for "multiples of light speed". An "unabashed" use appeared already in 1969, where "Bob Shaw's The Palace of Eternity features such delights as a million-ton tachyonic spaceship travelling at 30,000 times the speed of light." In the Star Trek franchise, in addition to facilitating faster-than-light travel, tachyons have been mentioned "for varied purposes, including cloaking a spacecraft, detection" of such cloaking and overcoming defensive shields, which has been regarded as "technobabble" by Mashable contributor Keith Wagstaff: dialogue that implies a scientific explanation, using a term with a real scientific concept behind it, "but really doesn't mean much."

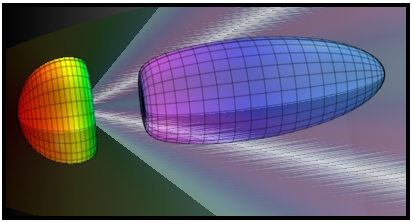
Tachyon model.

Animation

As a means of faster-than-light travel, the concept brings with it the consideration of transforming ordinary matter into tachyons and back, as is employed in the Frederik Pohl's 1979 novel Jem and Foundation's Edge (1982) by Isaac Asimov. Farthest Star (1975) by Pohl and Jack Williamson expands this by the notion that the necessary copying technique might be employed not only to transport an original person, but to create duplicates, which might be self-aware or remote-controlled via interstellar distances. A use for slower-than-light propulsion appeared in Joe Haldeman's 1974 novel The Forever War under the name tachyon rocket and has been further described by John G. Cramer as tachyon drive in 1993: Tachyons ejected in a directed beam could be used to propel a spaceship forward with high acceleration while reducing the necessity to carry fuel.

A disruptive use is featured in the comic book series Watchmen (1986–1987) by Alan Moore and Dave Gibbons, where the particles interfere with the superpower of major character Dr. Manhattan to perceive the future, "presumably because tachyons scramble cause and effect".

Science fiction scholar Gary Westfahl concluded for appearances of tachyons that "since most scientists discount the possibility that such particles actually exist, they have only rarely figured in science fiction".

== See also ==
- A chronon, a proposed elementary particle related to a hypothesis that proposes that time is not continuous
- Thiotimoline, a fictional organic compound from short stories by science fiction writer Isaac Asimov
- Johnny and the Bomb, a 1996 novel by Terry Pratchett, features a character called Mrs. Tachyon, who can time travel.
