= Tachyon =

Hypothetical faster-than-light particle

- Classification: Elementary particle
- Status: Hypothetical
- Theorized: 1967

A tachyon (/ˈtækiɒn/) or tachyonic particle is a hypothetical particle that always travels faster than light. Physicists posit that faster-than-light particles cannot exist because they are inconsistent with the known laws of physics. If such particles did exist, they perhaps could be used to send signals faster than light and into the past. According to the theory of relativity, this would violate causality, leading to logical paradoxes such as the grandfather paradox. Tachyons would exhibit the unusual property of increasing in speed as their energy decreases and would require infinite energy to slow to the speed of light. No verifiable experimental evidence has been found to support the existence of such particles.

The term "tachyon" was coined by Gerald Feinberg in a 1967 paper about excitations of a quantum field with imaginary mass. Subsequent research showed that these excitations do not propagate faster than light. Nevertheless, particle physicists continue to use the term "tachyon" when discussing tachyonic fields, including in the context of tachyon condensation.

== Etymology ==
The term tachyon comes from the Greek: ταχύς, tachus, meaning swift. The complementary particle types are called luxons (which always move at the speed of light) and bradyons (which always move slower than light); both of these particle types are known to exist.

== History ==
Faster-than-light particles were discussed before the advent of relativity by such physicists as JJ Thomson and Arnold Sommerfeld. The possibility of existence of faster-than-light particles was also proposed by Lev Yakovlevich Shtrum in 1923.

In 1962 and again in 1969 Oleksa-Myron Bilanuik, Vijay Deshpande and E. C. George Sudarshan discussed the possibility of a class of faster-than-light particles consistent with special relativity. As part of their discussion they point out that light particles are never accelerated but rather move at the full velocity of light upon generation. Similarly they argue that while accelerating normal matter beyond the speed of light is inconsistent with special relativity, this does not prevent creation of faster-than-light particles.

The term tachyon was coined by Gerald Feinberg in a 1967 paper titled "Possibility of faster-than-light particles". He proposed that tachyonic particles could be made from excitations of a quantum field with imaginary mass. He had been inspired by the science-fiction story "Beep" by James Blish. Feinberg studied the kinematics of such particles according to special relativity. In his paper, he also introduced fields with imaginary mass (now also referred to as tachyons) in an attempt to understand the microphysical origin such particles might have. It was soon realized that Feinberg's model did not in fact allow for superluminal (faster than light) particles or signals and that tachyonic fields merely give rise to instabilities, not causality violations. The term tachyonic field refers to imaginary mass fields rather than to faster-than-light particles.

In September 2011, it was reported that a tau neutrino had traveled faster than the speed of light; however, later updates from CERN on the OPERA experiment indicate that the faster-than-light readings were due to a faulty element of the experiment's fibre optic timing system.

== Special relativity ==
In special relativity, a faster-than-light particle would have spacelike four-momentum, unlike ordinary particles that have time-like four-momentum. While some theories suggest the mass of tachyons is imaginary, modern formulations often consider their mass to be real, with redefined formulas for momentum and energy. Additionally, since tachyons are confined to the spacelike portion of the energy–momentum graph, they cannot slow down to subluminal (slower-than-light) speeds.

=== Mass ===
In a Lorentz invariant theory, the same formulas that apply to ordinary slower-than-light particles (sometimes called bradyons in discussions of tachyons) must also apply to tachyons. In particular, the energy–momentum relation:

$$E^2 = (pc)^2+ (mc^2)^2 \;$$

(where p is the relativistic momentum of the bradyon and m is its rest mass) should still apply, along with the formula for the total energy of a particle:

$$E = \frac{mc^2}{\sqrt{1 - \frac{v^2}{c^2}}}.$$

This equation shows that the total energy of a particle (bradyon or tachyon) contains a contribution from its rest mass (the "rest mass–energy") and a contribution from its motion, the kinetic energy. When $v$ (the particle's velocity) is larger than $c$ (the speed of light), the denominator in the equation for the energy is imaginary, as the value under the square root is negative. Because the total energy of the particle must be real (and not a complex or imaginary number) in order to have any practical meaning as a measurement, the numerator must also be imaginary (i.e. the rest mass m must be imaginary, as a pure imaginary number divided by another pure imaginary number is a real number).

In some modern formulations of the theory, the mass of tachyons is regarded as real.

=== Speed ===
One curious effect is that, unlike ordinary particles, the speed of a tachyon increases as its energy decreases. In particular, $E$ approaches zero when $v$ approaches infinity. (For ordinary bradyonic matter, $E$ increases with increasing speed, becoming arbitrarily large as $v$ approaches $c$, the speed of light.) Therefore, just as bradyons are forbidden to break the light-speed barrier, so are tachyons forbidden from slowing down to below c, because infinite energy is required to reach the barrier from either above or below.

As noted by Albert Einstein, Richard C. Tolman, and others, special relativity implies that faster-than-light particles, if they existed, could be used to communicate backwards in time.

=== Neutrinos ===
In 1985, Chodos proposed that neutrinos can have a tachyonic nature. The possibility of standard model particles moving at faster-than-light speeds can be modeled using Lorentz invariance violating terms, for example in the Standard-Model Extension. In this framework, neutrinos experience Lorentz-violating oscillations and can travel faster than light at high energies. This proposal was strongly criticized.

=== Superluminal information ===
Spacetime diagram showing that moving faster than light implies time travel in the context of special relativity. A spaceship departs from Earth from A to C slower than light. At B, Earth emits a tachyon, which travels faster than light but forward in time in Earth's reference frame. It reaches the spaceship at C. The spaceship then sends another tachyon back to Earth from C to D. This tachyon also travels forward in time in the spaceship's reference frame. This effectively allows Earth to send a signal from B to D, back in time.

If tachyons can transmit information faster than light, then, according to relativity, they violate causality, leading to logical paradoxes of the "kill your own grandfather" type. This is often illustrated with thought experiments such as the "tachyon telephone paradox" or "logically pernicious self-inhibitor."

The problem can be understood in terms of the relativity of simultaneity in special relativity, which says that different inertial reference frames will disagree on whether two events at different locations happened "at the same time" or not, and they can also disagree on the order of the two events. (Technically, these disagreements occur when the spacetime interval between the events is 'space-like', meaning that neither event lies in the future light cone of the other.)

If one of the two events represents the sending of a signal from one location and the second event represents the reception of the same signal at another location, then, as long as the signal is moving at the speed of light or slower, the mathematics of simultaneity ensures that all reference frames agree that the transmission-event happened before the reception-event. However, in the case of a hypothetical signal moving faster than light, there would always be some frames in which the signal was received before it was sent, so that the signal could be said to have moved backward in time. Because one of the two fundamental postulates of special relativity says that the laws of physics should work the same way in every inertial frame, if it is possible for signals to move backward in time in any one frame, it must be possible in all frames. This means that if observer A sends a signal to observer B which moves faster than light in A's frame but backwards in time in B's frame, and then B sends a reply which moves faster than light in B's frame but backwards in time in A's frame, it could work out that A receives the reply before sending the original signal, challenging causality in every frame and opening the door to severe logical paradoxes. This is known as the tachyonic antitelephone.

==== Reinterpretation principle ====
The reinterpretation principle asserts that a tachyon sent back in time can always be reinterpreted as a tachyon traveling forward in time, because observers cannot distinguish between the emission and absorption of tachyons. The attempt to detect a tachyon from the future (and violate causality) would actually create the same tachyon and send it forward in time (which is causal).

However, this principle is not universally accepted as resolving the paradoxes. Instead, what would be required to avoid paradoxes is that, unlike any known particle, tachyons do not interact in any way and can never be detected or observed, because otherwise a tachyon beam could be modulated and used to create an anti-telephone or a "logically pernicious self-inhibitor".

== Fundamental models ==
In modern physics, all fundamental particles are regarded as excitations of quantum fields. There are several distinct ways in which tachyonic particles could be embedded into a field theory.

=== Fields with imaginary mass ===
In the paper that coined the term "tachyon", Gerald Feinberg studied Lorentz invariant quantum fields with imaginary mass. Because the group velocity for such a field is superluminal, naively it appears that its excitations propagate faster than light. However, it was quickly understood that the superluminal group velocity does not correspond to the speed of propagation of any localized excitation (like a particle). Instead, the negative mass represents an instability to tachyon condensation, and all excitations of the field propagate subluminally and are consistent with causality. Despite having no faster-than-light propagation, such fields are referred to simply as "tachyons" in many sources.

Tachyonic fields play an important role in modern physics. Perhaps the most famous is the Higgs boson of the Standard Model of particle physics, which has an imaginary mass in its uncondensed phase. In general, the phenomenon of spontaneous symmetry breaking, which is closely related to tachyon condensation, plays an important role in many aspects of theoretical physics, including the Ginzburg–Landau and BCS theories of superconductivity. Another example of a tachyonic field is the tachyon of bosonic string theory.

Tachyons are predicted by bosonic string theory and also the Neveu-Schwarz (NS) and NS-NS sectors, which are respectively the open bosonic sector and closed bosonic sector, of RNS superstring theory prior to the GSO projection. However such tachyons are not possible due to the Sen conjecture, also known as tachyon condensation. This resulted in the necessity for the GSO projection.

=== Lorentz-violating theories ===
In theories that do not respect Lorentz invariance, the speed of light is not (necessarily) a barrier, and particles can travel faster than the speed of light without infinite energy or causal paradoxes. A class of field theories of that type is called Standard Model Extension. However, the experimental evidence for Lorentz invariance is extremely good, so such theories are very tightly constrained.

=== Fields with non-canonical kinetic term ===
By modifying the kinetic term of the field, it is possible to produce Lorentz invariant field theories with excitations that propagate superluminally. However, such theories, in general, do not have a well-defined Cauchy problem (for reasons related to the issues of causality discussed above), and are probably inconsistent quantum mechanically.

== In fiction ==
Tachyons have appeared in many works of fiction. They have been used as a standby mechanism upon which many science fiction authors rely to establish faster-than-light communication, with or without reference to causality issues. The word tachyon has become widely recognized to such an extent that it can impart a science-fictional connotation even if the subject in question has no particular relation to superluminal travel (a form of technobabble, akin to positronic brain).

== See also ==
- Lorentz-violating neutrino oscillations
- Retrocausality
- Tachyonic antitelephone
- Virtual particle
- Wheeler–Feynman absorber theory
