= Gerald Feinberg =

American physicist (1933–1992)

- Born: May 27, 1933; New York City
- Died: April 21, 1992 (aged 58); New York City
- Education: Columbia University
- Scientific career
- Fields: Particle physics
- Workplaces: Columbia University
- Thesis: Meson Production in Nucleon-Nucleon Collisions (1957)
- Doctoral advisor: Tsung-Dao Lee
- Doctoral students: Scott Dodelson

Gerald Feinberg (27 May 1933 – 21 April 1992) was a Columbia University physicist, futurist and popular science author. He spent a year as a Member of the Institute for Advanced Study, and two years at the Brookhaven Laboratories. Feinberg went to Bronx High School of Science with Steven Weinberg and Sheldon Glashow and obtained his bachelor's and graduate degrees from Columbia University. His father was Yiddish poet and journalist Leon Feinberg. Among his students were Scott Dodelson, physicist at Carnegie Mellon University.

== Research ==
He coined the term tachyon for hypothetical faster-than-light particles and analysed their quantum field properties, predicted the existence of the muon neutrino and advocated cryonics as a public service. He was a member of the Foresight Institute's advisory panel.

=== Parapsychology ===
Feinberg wrote a foreword to Edgar Mitchell's book Psychic Explorations (1974) in which he endorsed psychic phenomena. His concept of a tachyon, a theoretical particle that travels faster than the speed of light has been advocated by some parapsychologists who claim that it could explain precognition or psychokinesis. However, there is no scientific evidence tachyon particles exist and such paranormal claims have been described as pseudoscientific.

== Publications ==
Books

- Cosmological Constants (with co-editor Jeremy Bernstein, 1986). ISBN 978-0-231-06376-0
- Solid Clues: Quantum Physics, Molecular Biology, and the Future of Science, Simon & Schuster, 1985. ISBN 0-434-26200-5
- Life Beyond Earth: The Intelligent Earthling's Guide to Extraterrestrial Life (with Robert Shapiro), Morrow, 1980. ISBN 0-688-08642-X
- What is the world made of? : Atoms, leptons, quarks, and other tantalizing particles, Anchor Press/Doubleday, 1977. ISBN 0-385-07694-0 & ISBN 0-385-07693-2
- Consequences of Growth: The Prospects for a Limitless Future, Seabury Press, New York, 1977. ISBN 0-8164-9326-X Review
- The Prometheus Project, Mankind's Search for Long-Range Goals, Anchor Books, 1969. ISBN 0-385-03613-2

Papers

- G. Feinberg, Shaughan Lavine, D.Z. Albert (1992). "Knowledge of the Past and Future". Journal of Philosophy. 89 (12): 607–642. doi:10.2307/2940898. JSTOR 2940898.
- G. Feinberg; D.Z. Albert; S. Lavine (1989). "Two types of prediction in Newtonian and quantum mechanics". Physics Letters A. 138 (9): 454–458. Bibcode:1989PhLA..138..454F. doi:10.1016/0375-9601(89)90743-3.
- G. Feinberg (1967). "Possibility of Faster-Than-Light Particles". Physical Review. 159 (5): 1089–1105. Bibcode:1967PhRv..159.1089F. doi:10.1103/PhysRev.159.1089.
- G. Feinberg (1966). "Physics and Life Prolongation". Physics Today. 19 (11): 45–48. Bibcode:1966PhT....19k..45F. doi:10.1063/1.3047814.
- G. Feinberg (1966). "Physics and the Thales Problem". Journal of Philosophy. 63 (1): 5–16. doi:10.2307/2024523. JSTOR 2024523.
