= Tachyonic antitelephone =

Hypothetical device in theoretical physics

A tachyonic antitelephone is a hypothetical device in theoretical physics that could be used to send signals into one's own past. Albert Einstein in 1907 presented a thought experiment of how faster-than-light signals can lead to a paradox of causality, which was described by Einstein and Arnold Sommerfeld in 1910 as a means "to telegraph into the past". The same thought experiment was described by Richard Chace Tolman in 1917; thus, it is also known as Tolman's paradox.

A device capable of "telegraphing into the past" was later also called a "tachyonic antitelephone" by Gregory Benford, David Book, and William Newcomb. (Note: Due to the tachyon being a hypothesized faster-than-light particle.) According to the current understanding of physics, no such faster-than-light transfer of information is possible.

== One-way example ==
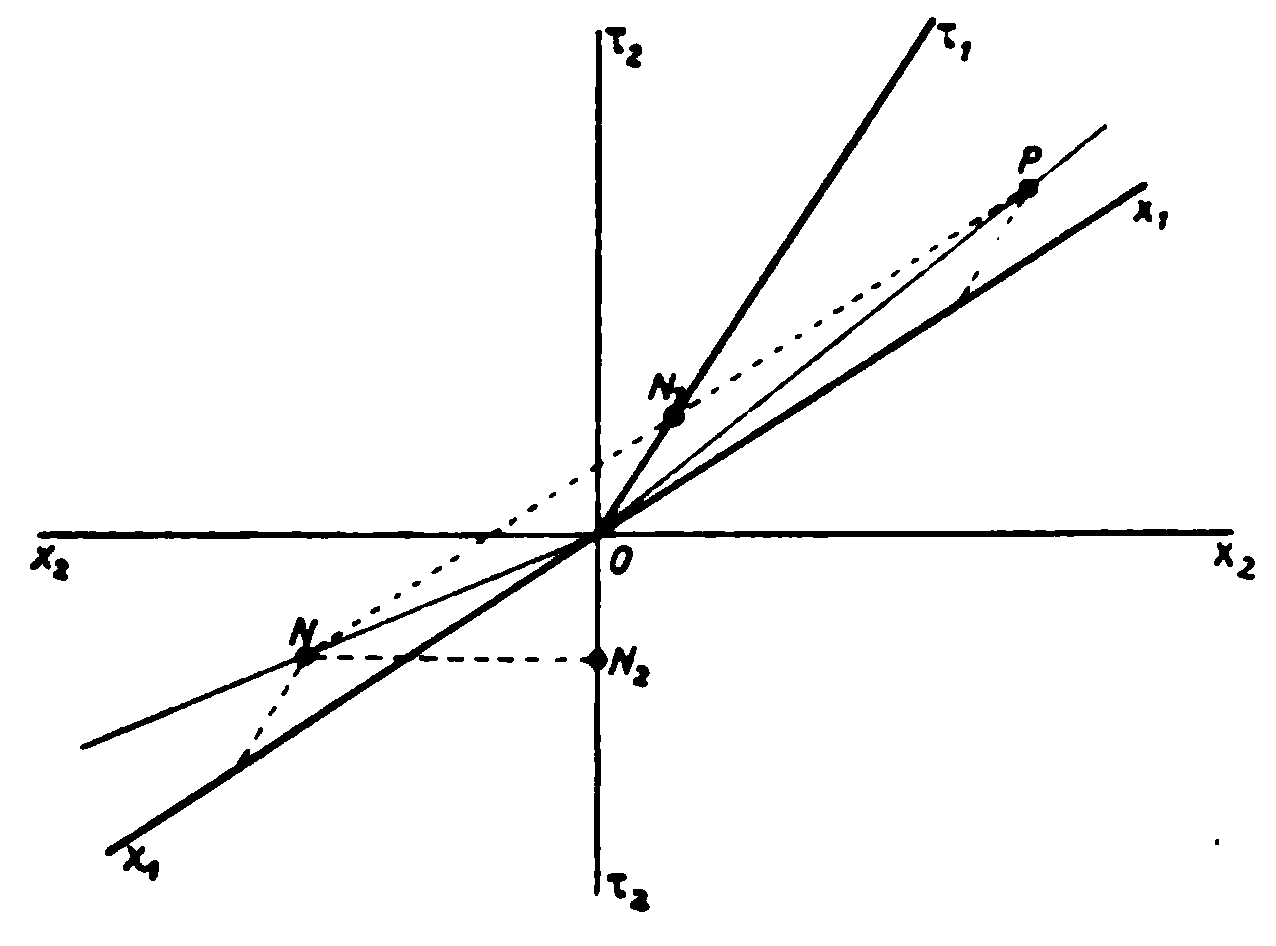
This was illustrated in 1911 by Paul Ehrenfest using a Minkowski diagram. Signals are sent in frame B1 into the opposite directions OP and ON with a velocity approaching infinity. Here, event O happens before N. However, in another frame B2, event N happens before O.

Tolman used the following variation of Einstein's thought experiment: Imagine a distance with endpoints $A$ and $B$. Let a signal be sent from A propagating with velocity $a$ towards B. All of this is measured in an inertial frame where the endpoints are at rest. The arrival at B is given by:

$$\Delta t=t_{1}-t_{0}=\frac{B-A}{a}.$$

Here, the event at A is the cause of the event at B. However, in the inertial frame moving with relative velocity v, the time of arrival at B is given according to the Lorentz transformation (c is the speed of light):

$$\begin{align}
\Delta t' & =t'_{1}-t'_{0}=\frac{t_{1}-vB/c^{2}}{\sqrt{1-v^{2}/c^{2}}}-\frac{t_{0}-vA/c^{2}}{\sqrt{1-v^{2}/c^{2}}}\\
& =\frac{1-av/c^{2}}{\sqrt{1-v^{2}/c^{2}}}\Delta t.
\end{align}$$

It can be easily shown that if a > c, then certain values of v can make Δt' negative. In other words, the effect arises before the cause in this frame. Einstein (and similarly Tolman) concluded that this result contains in their view no logical contradiction; he said, however, it contradicts the totality of our experience so that the impossibility of a > c seems to be sufficiently proven.

== Two-way example ==
A more common variation of this thought experiment is to send back the signal to the sender. (Note: A similar example to the one presented in this section was given by David Bohm.) Consider the case of Alice (A), on a spacecraft moving away from the Earth in the positive x-direction with a speed $v$, who wants to communicate with Bob (B) back home. Assume both of them have a device that is capable of transmitting and receiving faster-than-light signals at a speed of $a$$c$ with $a > 1.$ Alice uses this device to send a message to Bob, who sends a reply. If the origin of the coordinates of Bob's reference frame, $S$, coincide with the reception of Alice's message to him, then if Bob immediately sends a message back to Alice, then in his rest frame the coordinates of the reply signal (in natural units so that c=1) are given by:

$$(t,x) = (t,at)$$

To find out when the reply is received by Alice, we perform a Lorentz transformation to Alice's frame $S'$ moving in the positive x-direction with velocity $v$ with respect to the Earth. In this frame Alice is at rest at position $x' = L$, where $L$ is the distance that the signal Alice sent to Earth traversed in her rest frame. The coordinates of the reply signal are given by:

$$t' = \gamma \left(1 - av\right) t$$
$$x' = \gamma \left(a -  v\right) t$$

The reply is received by Alice when $x' = L$. This means that $t = \tfrac{L}{\gamma(a - v)}$ and thus:

$$t' = \frac{1 - av}{a - v}L$$

Since the message Alice sent to Bob took a time of $\tfrac{L}{a}$ to reach him, the message she receives back from him will reach her at time:

$$T = \frac{L}{a} + t' = \left(\frac{1}{a} + \frac{1 - av}{a - v}\right)L$$

later than she sent her message. However, if $v > \tfrac{2a}{1 + a^2}$ then $T < 0$ and Alice will receive the message back from Bob before she sends her message to him in the first place.

== Numerical example with two-way communication ==
As a further two-way example but including numerical values, Alice and Bob are aboard spaceships moving inertially with a relative speed of 0.8c. At some point they pass right next to each other, and Alice defines the position and time of their passing to be at position x = 0, time t = 0 in her frame, while Bob defines it to be at position x′ = 0 and time t′ = 0 in his frame (note that this is different from the convention used in the previous section, where the origin of the coordinates was the event of Bob receiving a tachyon signal from Alice). In Alice's frame she remains at rest at position x = 0, while Bob is moving in the positive x direction at 0.8c; in Bob's frame he remains at rest at position x′ = 0, and Alice is moving in the negative x′ direction at 0.8c. Each one also has a tachyon transmitter aboard their ship, which sends out signals that move at 2.4c in the ship's own frame.

When Alice's clock shows that 300 days have elapsed since she passed next to Bob (t = 300 days in her frame), she uses the tachyon transmitter to send a message to Bob, saying "Ugh, I just ate some bad shrimp". At t = 450 days in Alice's frame, she calculates that since the tachyon signal has been traveling away from her at 2.4c for 150 days, it should now be at position x = 2.4×150 = 360 light-days in her frame, and since Bob has been traveling away from her at 0.8c for 450 days, he should now be at position x = 0.8×450 = 360 light-days in her frame as well, meaning that this is the moment the signal catches up with Bob. So, in her frame Bob receives Alice's message at x = 360, t = 450. Due to the effects of time dilation, in her frame Bob is aging more slowly than she is by a factor of $\frac{1}{ \gamma} = \sqrt{1 - { (v/c)^2}}$, in this case 0.6, so Bob's clock only shows that 0.6×450 = 270 days have elapsed when he receives the message, meaning that in his frame he receives it at x′ = 0, t′ = 270.

When Bob receives Alice's message, he immediately uses his own tachyon transmitter to send a message back to Alice saying "Don't eat the shrimp!" 135 days later in his frame, at t′ = 270 + 135 = 405, he calculates that since the tachyon signal has been traveling away from him at 2.4c in the −x′ direction for 135 days, it should now be at position x′ = −2.4×135 = −324 light-days in his frame, and since Alice has been traveling at 0.8c in the −x direction for 405 days, she should now be at position x′ = −0.8×405 = −324 light-days as well. So, in his frame Alice receives his reply at x′ = −324, t′ = 405. Time dilation for inertial observers is symmetrical, so in Bob's frame Alice is aging more slowly than he is, by the same factor of 0.6, so Alice's clock should only show that 0.6×405 = 243 days have elapsed when she receives his reply. This means that she receives a message from Bob saying "Don't eat the shrimp!" only 243 days after she passed Bob, while she was not supposed to send the message saying "Ugh, I just ate some bad shrimp" until 300 days elapsed since she passed Bob, so Bob's reply constitutes a warning about her own future.

These numbers can be double-checked using the Lorentz transformation. The Lorentz transformation says that if the coordinates are known to be x t, of some event in Alice's frame, the same event must have the following x′, t′ coordinates in Bob's frame:

$$\begin{align}
t' &= \gamma \left( t - \frac{vx}{c^2} \right)  \\
x' &= \gamma \left( x - v t \right)\\
\end{align}$$

Where v is Bob's speed along the x-axis in Alice's frame, c is the speed of light (we are using units of days for time and light-days for distance, so in these units c = 1), and $\gamma = \frac{1}{ \sqrt{1 - { (v/c)^2}}}$ is the Lorentz factor. In this case v=0.8c, and $\gamma = \frac{1}{0.6}$. In Alice's frame, the event of Alice sending the message happens at x = 0, t = 300, and the event of Bob receiving Alice's message happens at x = 360, t = 450. Using the Lorentz transformation, we find that in Bob's frame the event of Alice sending the message happens at position x′ = (1/0.6)×(0 − 0.8×300) = −400 light-days, and time t′ = (1/0.6)×(300 − 0.8×0) = 500 days. Likewise, in Bob's frame the event of Bob receiving Alice's message happens at position x′ = (1/0.6)×(360 − 0.8×450) = 0 light-days, and time t′ = (1/0.6)×(450 − 0.8×360) = 270 days, which are the same coordinates for Bob's frame that were found in the earlier paragraph.

Comparing the coordinates in each frame, we see that in Alice's frame her tachyon signal moves forwards in time (she sent it at an earlier time than Bob received it), and between being sent and received we have (difference in position)/(difference in time) = 360/150 = 2.4c. In Bob's frame, Alice's signal moves back in time (he received it at t′ = 270, but it was sent at t′ = 500), and it has a (difference in position)/(difference in time) of 400/230, about 1.739c. The fact that the two frames disagree about the order of the events of the signal being sent and received is an example of the relativity of simultaneity, a feature of relativity which has no analogue in classical physics, and which is key to understanding why in relativity FTL communication must necessarily lead to causality violation.

Bob is assumed to have sent his reply almost instantaneously after receiving Alice's message, so the coordinates of his sending the reply can be assumed to be the same: x = 360, t = 450 in Alice's frame, and x′ = 0, t′ = 270 in Bob's frame. If the event of Alice receiving Bob's reply happens at x′ = 0, t′ = 243 in her frame (as in the earlier paragraph), then according to the Lorentz transformation, in Bob's frame Alice receives his reply at position x′' = (1/0.6)×(0 − 0.8×243) = −324 light-days, and at time t′ = (1/0.6)×(243 − 0.8×0) = 405 days. So evidently Bob's reply does move forward in time in his own frame, since the time it was sent was t′ = 270 and the time it was received was t′ = 405. And in his frame (difference in position)/(difference in time) for his signal is 324/135 = 2.4c, exactly the same as the speed of Alice's original signal in her own frame. Likewise, in Alice's frame Bob's signal moves backwards in time (she received it before he sent it), and it has a (difference in position)/(difference in time) of 360/207, about 1.739c.

Thus the times of sending and receiving in each frame, as calculated using the Lorentz transformation, match up with the times given in earlier paragraphs, before we made explicit use of the Lorentz transformation. And by using the Lorentz transformation we can see that the two tachyon signals behave symmetrically in each observer's frame: the observer who sends a given signal measures it to move forward in time at 2.4c, the observer who receives it measures it to move back in time at 1.739c. This sort of possibility for symmetric tachyon signals is necessary if tachyons are to respect the first of the two postulates of special relativity, which says that all laws of physics must work exactly the same in all inertial frames. This implies that if it is possible to send a signal at 2.4c in one frame, it must be possible in any other frame as well, and likewise if one frame can observe a signal that moves backwards in time, any other frame must be able to observe such a phenomenon as well. This is another key idea in understanding why FTL communication leads to causality violation in relativity; if tachyons were allowed to have a "preferred frame" in violation of the first postulate of relativity, in that case it could theoretically be possible to avoid causality violations.

== Paradoxes ==
Benford et al. wrote about such paradoxes in general, offering a scenario in which two parties are able to send a message two hours into the past:

The paradoxes of backward-in-time communication are well known. Suppose A and B enter into the following agreement: A will send a message at three o'clock if and only if he does not receive one at one o'clock. B sends a message to reach A at one o'clock immediately on receiving one from A at three o'clock. Then the exchange of messages will take place if and only if it does not take place. This is a genuine paradox, a causal contradiction.

They concluded that superluminal particles such as tachyons are therefore not allowed to convey signals.

== See also ==
- Grandfather paradox
- Ansible
- Temporal paradox
