= Imaginary number =

Square root of a non-positive real number

The powers of i
are cyclic:
$\ \vdots$
$\ i^{-2} = -1\phantom{i}$
$\ i^{-1} = -i\phantom1$
$\ \ i^{0}\ = \phantom-1\phantom{i}$
$\ \ i^{1}\ = \phantom-i\phantom1$
$\ \ i^{2}\ = -1\phantom{i}$
$\ \ i^{3}\ = -i\phantom1$
$\ \ i^{4}\ = \phantom-1\phantom{i}$
$\ \ i^{5}\ = \phantom-i\phantom1$
$\ \vdots$
$i$ is a $4$th
root of unity

An imaginary number is the product of a real number and the imaginary unit i, (Note: j is usually used in engineering contexts where i has other meanings (such as electrical current).) which is defined by its property i^{2} = −1. The square of an imaginary number bi is −b^{2}. For example, 5i is an imaginary number, and its square is −25. The number zero is considered to be both real and imaginary.

Originally coined in the 17th century by René Descartes as a derogatory term and regarded as fictitious or useless, the concept gained wide acceptance following the work of Leonhard Euler in the 18th century, and Augustin-Louis Cauchy and Carl Friedrich Gauss in the early 19th century.

An imaginary number bi can be added to a real number a to form a complex number of the form a + bi, where the real numbers a and b are called, respectively, the real part and the imaginary part of the complex number. Imaginary numbers are often called purely imaginary to distinguish them from complex numbers more generally; the set of all imaginary numbers is sometimes denoted $i\R$, where $\R$ denotes the set of real numbers.

== History ==
An illustration of the complex plane. The imaginary numbers are on the vertical coordinate axis.

Although the Greek mathematician and engineer Heron of Alexandria is noted as the first to present a calculation involving the square root of a negative number, it was Rafael Bombelli who first set down the rules for multiplication of complex numbers in 1572. The concept had appeared in print earlier, such as in Ars Magna (1545) by Gerolamo Cardano. At the time, imaginary numbers and negative numbers were poorly understood and were regarded by some as fictitious or useless, much as zero once was. Many other mathematicians were slow to adopt the use of imaginary numbers, including René Descartes, who wrote about them in his La Géométrie in which he coined the term imaginary and meant it to be derogatory. The use of imaginary numbers was not widely accepted until the work of Leonhard Euler (1707–1783) and Carl Friedrich Gauss (1777–1855). The geometric significance of complex numbers as points in a plane was first described by Caspar Wessel (1745–1818).

In 1843, William Rowan Hamilton extended the idea of an axis of imaginary numbers in the plane to a four-dimensional space of quaternion imaginaries in which three of the dimensions are analogous to the imaginary numbers in the complex field.

== Geometric interpretation ==
90-degree rotations in the complex plane

Geometrically, imaginary numbers are found on the vertical axis of the complex number plane, which allows them to be presented perpendicular to the real axis. One way of viewing imaginary numbers is: Firstly, to consider a standard number line, i.e., a horizontal x-axis on which positive real numbers increase in magnitude to the right and negative real numbers increase in magnitude to the left. Secondly, at 0 on the x-axis, to consider a vertical y-axis with "positive" direction going up; then, "positive" imaginary numbers increase in magnitude upwards and "negative" imaginary numbers increase in magnitude downwards. This vertical axis is often called the "imaginary axis".

In this representation, multiplication by i corresponds to a counterclockwise rotation of 90 degrees about the origin, which is a quarter of a turn. Multiplication by −i corresponds to a clockwise rotation of 90 degrees about the origin. Similarly, multiplying by a purely imaginary number bi, with b a real positive number, both causes a counterclockwise rotation about the origin by 90 degrees and scales the answer by a factor of b. When b < 0, this can instead be described as a clockwise rotation by 90 degrees and a scaling by |b|.

== Square roots of negative numbers ==
Set inclusions between the natural numbers ($\mathbb{N}$), the integers ($\mathbb{Z}$), the rational numbers ($\mathbb{Q}$), the real numbers ($\mathbb{R}$), and the complex numbers ($\mathbb{C}$)

Care must be used when working with imaginary numbers that are expressed as the principal values of the square roots of negative numbers. For example, the second equality in

$$\textstyle
\sqrt{6}
=\sqrt{(-2) \cdot (-3)}
\mathrel{\stackrel{\text{ (invalid) }}{=}} \sqrt{-2} \cdot \sqrt{-3}
= i\sqrt{2} \cdot i\sqrt{3}
= -\sqrt{6}\,$$

is invalid: the identity $\sqrt{xy} = \sqrt{x} \sqrt{y}$ for nonnegative real numbers does not always hold for the principal branch of the complex square root function.

== See also ==
- −1
- Dual number
- Split-complex number

== Bibliography ==
- Nahin, Paul (1998). An Imaginary Tale: the Story of the Square Root of −1. Princeton: Princeton University Press. ISBN 0-691-02795-1., explains many applications of imaginary expressions.
