= Jayant Narlikar =

Indian physicist and author (1938–2025)

Jayant Narlikar FNA, FASc, FTWAS
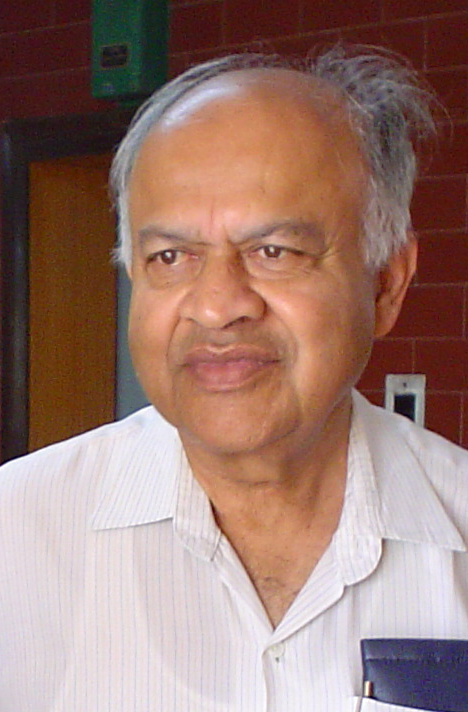
- Narlikar pictured in 2007
- Born: 19 July 1938; Kolhapur, Kolhapur State, British India (now Maharashtra, India)
- Died: 20 May 2025 (aged 86); Pune, Maharashtra, India
- Education: Banaras Hindu University; Cambridge University
- Known for: Quasi-steady state cosmology Hoyle–Narlikar theory of gravity
- Spouse: Mangala Narlikar
- Children: 3
- Awards: Smith's Prize (1962); Padma Bhushan (1965); Adams Prize (1967); Kalinga Prize (1996); Padma Vibhushan (2004); Prix Jules Janssen (2004); Maharashtra Bhushan (2010); Sahitya Akademi Award (2014); Vigyan Ratna Award (posthumous) (2025)
- Scientific career
- Fields: Physics, astronomy
- Workplaces: Cambridge University; TIFR; IUCAA
- Doctoral advisor: Fred Hoyle
- Doctoral students: Thanu Padmanabhan

Jayant Vishnu Narlikar FNA, FASc, FTWAS (19 July 1938 – 20 May 2025) was an Indian astrophysicist who performed research on alternative cosmology. He was also an author who wrote textbooks on cosmology, popular science books, and science fiction novels and short stories.

Narlikar studied at Banaras Hindu University and Cambridge University, where he obtained his PhD in 1963 working with Fred Hoyle. After postdoctoral work in Cambridge, in 1972 he was appointed a professor at the Tata Institute of Fundamental Research. In 1988, he became the first director of the Inter-University Centre for Astronomy and Astrophysics (IUCAA).

== Early life ==
Narlikar was born in Kolhapur, India, on 19 July 1938, into an academic family. His father, Vishnu Vasudev Narlikar, was a mathematician and theoretical physicist who was a professor and head of department at Banaras Hindu University (BHU), Varanasi. His mother, Sumati Narlikar, was a scholar of Sanskrit. His maternal uncle, V. S. Huzurbazar, was a statistician.

Narlikar went to school at Central Hindu College (now Central Hindu Boys School) in Varanasi. He then studied at BHU, where he received a Bachelor of Science degree in 1957. He continued his education at Cambridge University, where he was a member of Fitzwilliam College (as his father had been). He completed the mathematical tripos in 1959, for which he was awarded a Bachelor of Arts degree in mathematics and was Senior Wrangler. This degree was converted to an Oxbridge MA in 1964, without further study.

== Career ==
Narlikar began his research career as a doctoral student in theoretical cosmology, under the guidance of Fred Hoyle in Cambridge. He was awarded a Doctor of Philosophy degree in 1963. He was then a postdoctoral fellow at King's College in Cambridge. In 1966, Hoyle established the Institute of Theoretical Astronomy in Cambridge; Narlikar was a founding member of the institute, while remaining a fellow at King's College.

A dispute with university leadership led Hoyle to resign in 1972, and it was decided that his institute would merge into the Institute of Astronomy, Cambridge. Narlikar left Cambridge that year, returning to India as a professor at the Tata Institute of Fundamental Research in Mumbai, where he led its theoretical astrophysics group. In 1981, Narlikar became a founding member of the World Cultural Council. In 1988, he was appointed the founding director of the Inter-University Centre for Astronomy and Astrophysics (IUCAA) in Pune. From 1994–1997, he was the president of the International Astronomical Union commission for cosmology. The National Council of Educational Research and Training appointed Narlikar as chairperson of its committee responsible for developing textbooks in science and mathematics.

Narlikar publicly criticised pseudoscience, including astrology, arguing instead for evidence-based thinking.

== Research ==
Narlikar's research involved Mach's principle, quantum cosmology, and action-at-a-distance physics. Dissatisfied with the standard Big Bang model of cosmology, Narilkar investigated alternative models, a field known as non-standard cosmology.

With Fred Hoyle, he proposed a conformal gravity model now known as Hoyle–Narlikar theory, which attempted to produce an alternative theory of gravity that is consistent with Mach's principle. It proposes that the inertial mass of a particle is a function of the masses of all other particles, multiplied by a coupling constant, which is a function of cosmic time. The theory was not accepted by mainstream cosmology.

Narlikar collaborated with other critics of Big Bang cosmology, including Halton Arp, Geoffrey Burbidge, Hoyle and Chandra Wickramasinghe. In 1993, Hoyle, Burbidge and Narlikar proposed the quasi-steady state cosmological model. That model was incompatible with the accelerating expansion of the Universe, discovered in 1997, so Narilkar proposed another model in 2002. These alternative cosmology models did not receive widespread support.

Narlikar worked with Wickramasinghe, Hoyle and other collaborators on a high-altitude balloon flight that collected samples of microorganisms from the stratosphere, at altitudes up to 41 km.

== Personal life and death ==
Narlikar married Mangala Narlikar (née Rajwade), a mathematics researcher and professor. The couple had three daughters: Geeta, a biomedical researcher at the University of California, San Francisco, Girija and Leelavati who both work in computer science. He was the uncle of Amrita Narlikar, a social sciences academic at Cambridge University.

His wife, Mangala, died on 17 July 2023. Narlikar died on 20 May 2025, at the age of 87.

== Honours ==
Narlikar received many national and international awards and honorary doctorates. India's second-highest civilian honour, Padma Vibhushan, was awarded to him in 2004 for his research work. Prior to this, in 1965, he was conferred Padma Bhushan. He was awarded 'Rashtra Bhushan' in 1981 by FIE Foundation, Ichalkaranji. He received Maharashtra Bhushan Award for the year 2010. He was a recipient of Bhatnagar Award, M.P. Birla Award, and the Prix Jules Janssen of the Société astronomique de France (French Astronomical Society). He was an Associate of the Royal Astronomical Society of London, and a Fellow of the three Indian National Science Academies and the Third World Academy of Sciences. Apart from his scientific research, Narlikar was well known as a communicator of science through his books, articles, and radio and television programmes. For these efforts, he was honoured in 1996 by UNESCO with the Kalinga Prize. He was featured on Carl Sagan's TV show Cosmos: A Personal Voyage in the late 1980s. In 1989, he received the Atmaram Award by Central Hindi Directorate. He received the Indira Gandhi Award of the Indian National Science Academy in 1990. He also served on the Physical Sciences jury for the Infosys Prize in 2009. In 2014, he received a Sahitya Akademi Award for his autobiography in Marathi, Chaar Nagarantale Maze Vishwa. He presided over the 94th Akhil Bharatiya Marathi Sahitya Sammelan held at Nashik in January 2021. In 1960, he won the Tyson Medal for astronomy. During his doctoral studies at Cambridge, he won the Smith's Prize in 1962. He was awarded posthumously the Vigyan Ratna Award in 2025 by the Government of India for his contribution to Physics.

== Books ==
Besides scientific papers and books and popular science literature, Narlikar wrote science fiction, novels, and short stories in English, Hindi, and Marathi. He was also the consultant for the Science and Mathematics textbooks of NCERT (National Council of Educational Research and Training, India).

=== Non-fiction ===
In English:

- Facts and Speculations in Cosmology, with G. Burbridge, Cambridge University Press 2008, ISBN 978-0-521-13424-8
- Current Issues in Cosmology, 2006
- A Different Approach to Cosmology: From a Static Universe through the Big Bang towards Reality, 2005
- Fred Hoyle's Universe, 2003
- Scientific Edge: The Indian Scientist from Vedic to Modern Times, 2003
- An Introduction to Cosmology, 2002
- A Different Approach to Cosmology, with G. Burbridge and Fred Hoyle, Cambridge University Press 2000, ISBN 0-521-66223-0,
- Quasars and Active Galactic Nuclei: An Introduction, 1999
- From Black Clouds to Black Holes, 1996
- From Black Clouds to Black Holes (Third Edition), 2012,
- Seven Wonders of the Cosmos, 1995
- Philosophy of Science: Perspectives from Natural and Social Sciences, 1992
- Highlights in Gravitation and Cosmology, 1989
- The Primeval Universe, 1988
- Violent Phenomena in the Universe, 1982
- The Lighter Side of Gravity, 1982
- Physics-Astronomy Frontier (co-author Sir Fred Hoyle), 1981
- The Structure of the Universe, 1977
- Creation of Matter and Anomalous Redshifts, 2002
- Absorber Theory of Radiation in Expanding Universes, 2002

In Marathi:

- आकाशाशी जडले नाते
- नभात हसरे तारे

=== Fiction ===
In English:

- The Return of Vaman, 1989
- The Adventure
- The Comet

In Marathi:

- वामन परत न आला
- यक्षांची देणगी
- अभयारण्य
- व्हायरस
- प्रेषित
- अंतराळातील भस्मासूर
- टाईम मशीनची किमया
- उजव्या सोंडेचा गणपती

In Hindi:

- पार नज़र के
