= Quantum reference frame =

Reference frame in quantum mechanics

A quantum reference frame is a reference frame which is treated quantum theoretically. It is used to define physical quantities, such as time, position, momentum, spin, and so on. It has some unique properties which do not exist in a normal classical reference frame.

== Background ==
Consider a simple physics problem: a car is moving such that it covers a distance of 1 mile in every 2 minutes, what is its velocity in metres per second? With some conversion and calculation, one can come up with the answer "13.41m/s"; on the other hand, one can instead answer "0, relative to itself". The first answer is correct because it recognises a reference frame is implied in the problem. The second one, albeit pedantic, is also correct because it exploits the fact that there is not a particular reference frame specified by the problem. This simple problem illustrates the importance of a reference frame: a reference frame is quintessential in a clear description of a system, whether it is included implicitly or explicitly.

When speaking of a car moving towards east, one is referring to a particular point on the surface of the Earth; moreover, as the Earth is rotating, the car is actually moving towards a changing direction, with respect to the Sun. In fact, this is the best one can do: describing a system in relation to some reference frame. Describing a system with respect to an absolute space does not make much sense because an absolute space, if it exists, is unobservable. Hence, it is impossible to describe the path of the car in the above example with respect to some absolute space. This notion of absolute space troubled a lot of physicists over the centuries, including Newton. Indeed, Newton was fully aware of this stated that all inertial frames are observationally equivalent to each other. Simply put, relative motions of a system of bodies do not depend on the inertial motion of the whole system.

An inertial reference frame (or inertial frame in short) is a frame in which all the physical laws hold. For instance, in a rotating reference frame, Newton's laws have to be modified because there is an extra Coriolis force (such frame is an example of non-inertial frame). Here, "rotating" means "rotating with respect to some inertial frame". Therefore, although it is true that a reference frame can always be chosen to be any physical system for convenience, any system has to be eventually described by an inertial frame, directly or indirectly. Finally, one may ask how an inertial frame can be found, and the answer lies in the Newton's laws, at least in Newtonian mechanics: the first law guarantees the existence of an inertial frame while the second and third law are used to examine whether a given reference frame is an inertial one or not.

It may appear an inertial frame can now be easily found given the Newton's laws as empirical tests are accessible. Quite the contrary; an absolutely inertial frame is not and will most likely never be known. Instead, inertial frame is approximated. As long as the error of the approximation is undetectable by measurements, the approximately inertial frame (or simply "effective frame") is reasonably close to an absolutely inertial frame. With the effective frame and assuming the physical laws are valid in such frame, descriptions of systems will ends up as good as if the absolutely inertial frame was used. As a digression, the effective frame Astronomers use is a system called "International Celestial Reference Frame" (ICRF), defined by 212 radio sources and with an accuracy of about $10^{-5}$ radians. However, it is likely that a better one will be needed when a more accurate approximation is required.

Reconsidering the problem at the very beginning, one can certainly find a flaw of ambiguity in it, but it is generally understood that a standard reference frame is implicitly used in the problem. In fact, when a reference frame is classical, whether or not including it in the physical description of a system is irrelevant. One will get the same prediction by treating the reference frame internally or externally.

To illustrate the point further, a simple system with a ball bouncing off a wall is used. In this system, the wall can be treated either as an external potential or as a dynamical system interacting with the ball. The former involves putting the external potential in the equations of motions of the ball while the latter treats the position of the wall as a dynamical degree of freedom. Both treatments provide the same prediction, and neither is particularly preferred over the other. However, as it will be discussed below, such freedom of choice cease to exist when the system is quantum mechanical.

== Formulation ==
A reference frame can be treated in the formalism of quantum theory, and, in this case, such is referred as a quantum reference frame. Despite different name and treatment, a quantum reference frame still shares much of the notions with a reference frame in classical mechanics. It is associated to some physical system, and it is relational.

For example, if a spin-1/2 particle is said to be in the state $\left|\uparrow z \right\rangle$, a reference frame is implied, and it can be understood to be some reference frame with respect to an apparatus in a lab. It is obvious that the description of the particle does not place it in an absolute space, and doing so would make no sense at all because, as mentioned above, absolute space is empirically unobservable. On the other hand, if a magnetic field along y-axis is said to be given, the behaviour of the particle in such field can then be described. In this sense, y and z are just relative directions. They do not and need not have absolute meaning.

One can observe that a z direction used in a laboratory in Berlin is generally totally different from a z direction used in a laboratory in Melbourne. Two laboratories trying to establish a single shared reference frame will face important issues involving alignment. The study of this sort of communication and coordination is a major topic in quantum information theory.

Just as in this spin-1/2 particle example, quantum reference frames are almost always treated implicitly in the definition of quantum states, and the process of including the reference frame in a quantum state is called quantisation/internalisation of reference frame while the process of excluding the reference frame from a quantum state is called dequantisation/externalisation of reference frame. Unlike the classical case, in which treating a reference internally or externally is purely an aesthetic choice, internalising and externalising a reference frame does make a difference in quantum theory.

One final remark may be made on the existence of a quantum reference frame. After all, a reference frame, by definition, has a well-defined position and momentum, while quantum theory, namely uncertainty principle, states that one cannot describe any quantum system with well-defined position and momentum simultaneously, so it seems there is some contradiction between the two. It turns out, an effective frame, in this case a classical one, is used as a reference frame, just as in Newtonian mechanics a nearly inertial frame is used, and physical laws are assumed to be valid in this effective frame. In other words, whether motion in the chosen reference frame is inertial or not is irrelevant.

The following treatment of a hydrogen atom motivated by Aharanov and Kaufherr can shed light on the matter. Supposing a hydrogen atom is given in a well-defined state of motion, how can one describe the position of the electron? The answer is not to describe the electron's position relative to the same coordinates in which the atom is in motion, because doing so would violate uncertainty principle, but to describe its position relative to the nucleus. As a result, more can be said about the general case from this: in general, it is permissible, even in quantum theory, to have a system with well-defined position in one reference frame and well-defined motion in some other reference frame.

== Example ==
Consider a hydrogen atom. Coulomb potential depends on the distance between the proton and electron only:

$$V(r) = \frac{-Ze^2}{r}$$

With this symmetry, the problem is reduced to that of a particle in a central potential:

$$-\frac{1}{2m}\nabla^2 \psi(\vec{r}) + \frac{-Ze^2}{r} \psi(\vec{r}) = E\psi(\vec{r})$$

Using separation of variables, the solutions of the equation can be written into radial and angular parts:

$$\Phi(r,\theta,\phi) = R_{nl}(r) Y_{lm}(\theta, \phi)$$

where $l,$ $m$, and $n$ are the orbital angular momentum, magnetic, and energy quantum numbers, respectively.

Now consider the Schrödinger equation for the proton and the electron:

$$\frac{\partial}{\partial t}\Psi(x_1,y_1,z_1,x_2,y_2,z_2,t)=-iH\Psi(x_1,y_1,z_1,x_2,y_2,z_2,t)$$

A change of variables to relational and centre-of-mass coordinates yields

$$\frac{\partial \Psi(x,y,z,X,Y,Z)}{\partial t} = -i[-\frac{1}{2M}\nabla_{c.o.m.}^2 -\frac{1}{2\mu}\nabla_{rel}^2 +V(x,y,z)]\Psi$$

where $M$ is the total mass and $\mu$ is the reduced mass. A final change to spherical coordinates followed by a separation of variables will yield the equation for $\Phi(r,\theta,\phi)$ from above.

However, if the change of variables done early is now to be reversed, centre-of-mass needs to be put back into the equation for $\Phi(r,\theta,\phi)$:

$$r = \sqrt{(x_1-x_2)^2 +(y_1-y_2)^2+ (z_1-z_2)^2}$$

$$\theta = \tan^{-1}\left(\frac{\sqrt{(x_1-x_2)^2 +(y_1-y_2)^2}}{z_1-z_2} \right)$$

$$\phi=\tan^{-1}\left( \frac{y_1-y_2}{x_1-x_2}\right)$$

$$X=\frac{m_1x_1+m_2x_2}{m_1+m_2}$$

$$Y=\frac{m_1y_1+m_2y_2}{m_1+m_2}$$

$$Z=\frac{m_1z_1+m_2z_2}{m_1+m_2}$$

The importance of this result is that it shows the wavefunction for the compound system is entangled, contrary to what one would normally think in a classical standpoint. More importantly, it shows the energy of the hydrogen atom is not only associated with the electron but also with the proton, and the total state is not decomposable into a state for the electron and one for the proton separately.

== Implications ==
=== Superselection rules ===
Superselection rules, in short, are postulated rules forbidding the preparation of quantum states that exhibit coherence between eigenstates of certain observables. It was originally introduced to impose additional restriction to quantum theory beyond those of selection rules. As an example, superselection rules for electric charges disallow the preparation of a coherent superposition of different charge eigenstates.

As it turns out, the lack of a reference frame is mathematically equivalent to superselection rules. This is a powerful statement because superselection rules have long been thought to have axiomatic nature, and now its fundamental standing and even its necessity are questioned. Nevertheless, it has been shown that it is, in principle, always possible (though not always easy) to lift all superselection rules on a quantum system.

=== Degradation of a quantum reference frame ===
During a measurement, whenever the relations between the system and the reference frame used is inquired, there is inevitably a disturbance to both of them, which is known as measurement back action. As this process is repeated, it decreases the accuracy of the measurement outcomes, and such reduction of the usability of a reference frame is referred to as the degradation of a quantum reference frame. A way to gauge the degradation of a reference frame is to quantify the longevity, namely, the number of measurements that can be made against the reference frame until certain error tolerance is exceeded.

For example, for a spin-$j$ system, the maximum number of measurements that can be made before the error tolerance, $\epsilon$, is exceeded is given by $n_{max} \simeq \epsilon j^2$. So the longevity and the size of the reference frame are of quadratic relation in this particular case.

In this spin-$j$ system, the degradation is due to the loss of purity of the reference frame state. On the other hand, degradation can also be caused by misalignment of background reference. It has been shown, in such case, the longevity has a linear relation with the size of the reference frame.

== See also ==
- Information theory
- Quantum information
- Quantum spacetime
