= Absolute rotation =

Rotation independent of any external reference

Bouncing ball in a rotating space station: The objective reality of the ball bouncing off the outer hull is confirmed both by a rotating and by a non-rotating observer, hence the rotation of the space station is an "absolute", objective fact regardless of the chosen frame of reference.

In physics, the concept of absolute rotation—rotation independent of any external reference—is a topic of debate about relativity, cosmology, and the nature of physical laws.

For the concept of absolute rotation to be scientifically meaningful, it must be measurable. In other words, can an observer distinguish between the rotation of an observed object and their own rotation? Newton suggested two experiments to resolve this problem. One is the bucket argument, regarding the effects of centrifugal force upon the shape of the surface of water rotating in a bucket; it is equivalent to the phenomenon of rotational gravity used in proposals for human spaceflight. The second is the effect of centrifugal force upon the tension in a string joining two spheres rotating about their center of mass.

== Classical mechanics ==
=== Newton's bucket argument ===
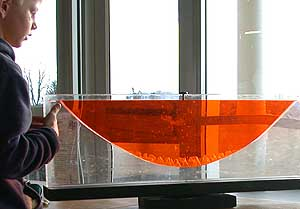
Figure 1: The interface of two immiscible liquids of different density (a denser colorless liquid and a lighter orange-colored liquid) rotating around a vertical axis is an upward-opening circular paraboloid.

Newton suggested the shape of the surface of the water indicates the presence or absence of absolute rotation relative to absolute space: rotating water has a curved surface, still water has a flat surface. Because rotating water has a concave surface, if the surface you see is concave, and the water does not seem to you to be rotating, then you are rotating with the water.

Centrifugal force is needed to explain the concavity of the water in a co-rotating frame of reference (one that rotates with the water) because the water appears stationary in this frame, and so should have a flat surface. Thus, observers looking at the stationary water need the centrifugal force to explain why the water surface is concave and not flat. The centrifugal force pushes the water toward the sides of the bucket, where it piles up deeper and deeper, Pile-up is arrested when any further climb costs as much work against gravity as is the energy gained from the centrifugal force, which is greater at larger radius.

If you need a centrifugal force to explain what you see, then you are rotating. Newton's conclusion was that rotation is absolute.

Other thinkers suggest that pure logic implies only relative rotation makes sense. For example, Bishop Berkeley and Ernst Mach (among others) suggested that it is relative rotation with respect to the fixed stars that matters, and rotation of the fixed stars relative to an object has the same effect as rotation of the object with respect to the fixed stars. Newton's arguments do not settle this issue; his arguments may be viewed, however, as establishing centrifugal force as a basis for an operational definition of what we actually mean by absolute rotation.

=== Rotating spheres ===
Figure 2: Two spheres tied with a string and rotating at an angular rate ω. Because of the rotation, the string tying the spheres together is under tension.

Newton also proposed another experiment to measure one's rate of rotation: using the tension in a cord joining two spheres rotating about their center of mass. Non-zero tension in the string indicates rotation of the spheres, whether or not the observer thinks they are rotating. This experiment is simpler than the bucket experiment in principle, because it need not involve gravity.

Beyond a simple "yes or no" answer to rotation, one may actually calculate one's rotation. To do that, one takes one's measured rate of rotation of the spheres and computes the tension appropriate to this observed rate. This calculated tension then is compared to the measured tension. If the two agree, one is in a stationary (non-rotating) frame. If the two do not agree, to obtain agreement, one must include a centrifugal force in the tension calculation; for example, if the spheres appear to be stationary, but the tension is non-zero, the entire tension is due to centrifugal force. From the necessary centrifugal force, one can determine one's speed of rotation; for example, if the calculated tension is greater than measured, one is rotating in the sense opposite to the spheres, and the larger the discrepancy the faster this rotation.

The tension in the wire is the required centripetal force to sustain the rotation. What is experienced by the physically rotating observer is the centripetal force and the physical effect arising from his own inertia. The effect arising from inertia is referred to as reactive centrifugal force.

Whether or not the effects from inertia are attributed to a fictitious centrifugal force is a matter of choice.

== Relativity ==
=== Special relativity ===
French physicist Georges Sagnac in 1913 conducted an experiment that was similar to the Michelson–Morley experiment, which was intended to observe the effects of rotation. Sagnac set up this experiment to prove the existence of the luminiferous aether that Einstein's 1905 theory of special relativity had discarded.

The Sagnac experiment and later similar experiments showed that a stationary object on the surface of the Earth will rotate once every rotation of the Earth when using stars as a stationary reference point. Rotation was thus concluded to be absolute rather than relative.

=== General relativity ===
Mach's principle is the name given by Einstein to a hypothesis often credited to the physicist and philosopher Ernst Mach.

The idea is that the local motion of a rotating reference frame is determined by the large-scale distribution of matter in the universe. Mach's principle says that there is a physical law that relates the motion of the distant stars to the local inertial frame. If you see all the stars whirling around you, Mach suggests that there is some physical law which would make it so you would feel a centrifugal force. The principle is often stated in vague ways, like "mass out there influences inertia here".

The example considered by Einstein was the rotating elastic sphere. Like a rotating planet bulging at the equator, a rotating sphere deforms into an oblate (squashed) spheroid depending on its rotation.

In classical mechanics, an explanation of this deformation requires external causes in a frame of reference in which the spheroid is not rotating, and these external causes may be taken as "absolute rotation" in classical physics and special relativity. In general relativity, no external causes are invoked. The rotation is relative to the local geodesics, and since the local geodesics eventually channel information from the distant stars, there appears to be absolute rotation relative to these stars.

== See also ==
- Absolute time and space
- Mach's principle
- Foucault pendulum
