= Mangala Narlikar =

Indian mathematician (1943–2023)

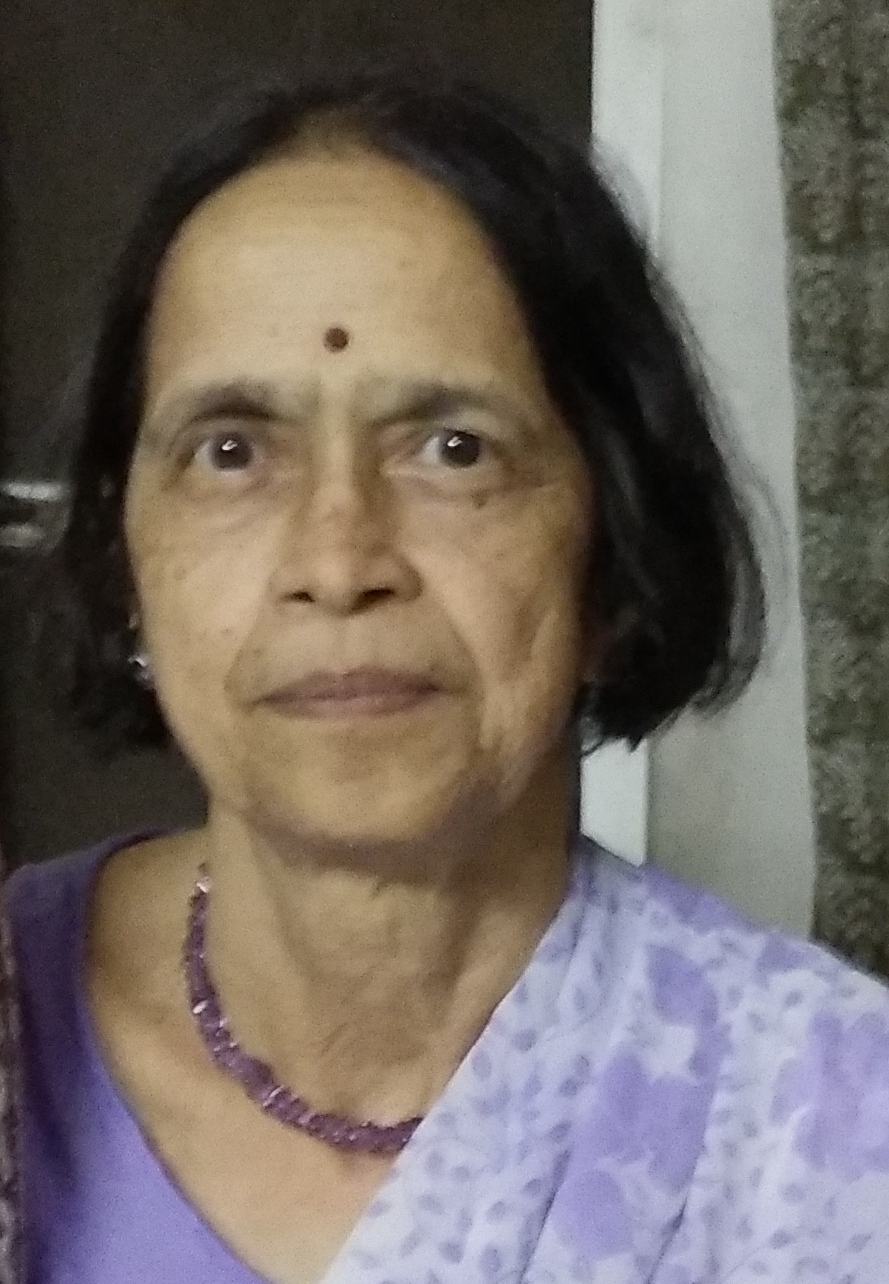
- Narlikar in 2017
- Born: Mangala Rajwade; 17 May 1943; Bombay, Bombay Province, British India
- Died: 17 July 2023 (aged 80); Pune, Maharashtra, India
- Education: University of Bombay
- Occupation: Mathematician
- Spouse: Jayant Narlikar (m. 1966)
- Children: 3

Mangala Narlikar (17 May 1943 – 17 July 2023) was an Indian mathematician who did research in pure mathematics as well as writing for a lay audience. After her degrees in mathematics, she initially worked at the Tata Institute of Fundamental Research (TIFR) in Mumbai and later worked as a lecturer in the University of Bombay and Pune.

== Biography ==
Narlikar was born as Mangala Rajwade on 17 May 1943 in Bombay, Bombay Province, as the place was known during the British India era. She studied from the University of Bombay and received degrees of B. A. (Maths) in 1962 and M.A. (Maths) in 1964 with first rank and also won the Chancellor's gold medal. She married, Jayant Narlikar, a well known cosmologist and physicist, in 1966. They have three daughters, Geeta, Girija and Leelavati, all of whom have pursued careers in science; one (Geeta) is a professor of biochemistry at the University of California, San Francisco, and the other two are in computer science.

From 1964 to 1966, Narlikar worked as a Research Student and Research Associate in the School of Mathematics of the Tata Institute of Fundamental Research, Mumbai. From 1967 to 1969, she taught the undergraduate school at the University of Cambridge. From 1974 to 1980 she again worked in the School of Mathematics of TIFR. She obtained her Ph.D. degree in mathematics from the University of Bombay, 16 years after her marriage, in 1981 on the subject of analytic number theory. After obtaining her doctoral degree, she continued to work with TIFR from 1982 to 1985 as a Pool Officer in the School of Mathematics. Her teaching assignments from 1982 to 1985 was for M Phil class in the Department of Mathematics in the University of Bombay. She also taught at intervals in the Department of Mathematics at the University of Pune from 1989 to 2002 and taught M Sc students at the centre in Bhaskaracharya Pratishthan from 2006 to 2010.

Narlikar's core fields of interest were real and complex analysis, analytic geometry, number theory, algebra, and topology.

On writing books on mathematics, Narlikar wrote: "I enjoyed writing a book on how to make mathematics interesting and accessible". On her combining her profession with looking after the household functions she wrote: "My story is perhaps a representation of the lives of many women of my generation who are well educated but always put household responsibilities before their personal careers". She was chairman of mathematics subject committee for Maharashtra State Bureau of Textbook Production and Curriculum Research.

Mangala Narlikar died of cancer on 17 July 2023, at the age of 80.

== Publications ==
Narlikar published a number of scientific papers and books which included:

=== Papers ===
- Theory of Sieved Integers, Acta Arithmetica 38, 157 in 19
- On a theorem of Erdos and Szemeredi, Hardy Ramanujan Journal 3, 41, in 1980
- On the Mean Square Value theorem of Hurwitz Zeta function, Proceedings of Indian Academy of Sciences 90, 195, 1981.
- Hybrid mean Value Theorem of L-functions, Hardy Ramanujan Journal 9, 11 - 16, 1986.
- On orders solely of Abelian Groups, Bulletin of London Mathematical Society, 20, 211 - 216, in 1988.
- several articles on mathematics in Science Age, to create interest in mathematics among lay people

=== Books ===
- Ganitachyaa Sopya Vata, a book in Marathi for schoolchildren
- An Easy Access to Basic Mathematics, a book for schoolchildren.
- A Cosmic Adventure, translation of a book on Astronomy by Professor J. V. Narlikar.

== Bibliography ==
- Chengalvarayan, P.; Gokilvani, Srinivasan (1 January 2007). Women mathematicians: their contributions, a critique. Regal Publications. ISBN 978-81-89915-72-8.
