= Absolute space and time =

Theoretical foundation of Newtonian mechanics

Absolute space and time is a concept in physics and philosophy about the properties of the universe. In physics, absolute space and time may be a preferred frame.

== Early concept ==
A version of the concept of absolute space (in the sense of a preferred frame) can be seen in Aristotelian physics. Robert S. Westman writes that a "whiff" of absolute space can be observed in Copernicus's De revolutionibus orbium coelestium, where Copernicus uses the concept of an immobile sphere of stars.

== Newton ==
Originally introduced by Sir Isaac Newton in Philosophiæ Naturalis Principia Mathematica, the concepts of absolute time and space provided a theoretical foundation that facilitated Newtonian mechanics. According to Newton, absolute time and space respectively are independent aspects of objective reality:

Absolute, true and mathematical time, of itself, and from its own nature flows equably without regard to anything external, and by another name is called duration: relative, apparent and common time, is some sensible and external (whether accurate or unequable) measure of duration by the means of motion, which is commonly used instead of true time ...

According to Newton, absolute time exists independently of any perceiver and progresses at a consistent pace throughout the universe. Unlike relative time, Newton believed absolute time was imperceptible and could only be understood mathematically. According to Newton, humans are only capable of perceiving relative time, which is a measurement of perceivable objects in motion (like the Moon or Sun). From these movements, we infer the passage of time.

Absolute space, in its own nature, without regard to anything external, remains always similar and immovable. Relative space is some movable dimension or measure of the absolute spaces; which our senses determine by its position to bodies: and which is vulgarly taken for immovable space ... Absolute motion is the translation of a body from one absolute place into another: and relative motion, the translation from one relative place into another ...

—

Isaac Newton

These notions imply that absolute space and time do not depend upon physical events, but are a backdrop or stage setting within which physical phenomena occur. Thus, every object has an absolute state of motion relative to absolute space, so that an object must be either in a state of absolute rest, or moving at some absolute speed. To support his views, Newton provided some empirical examples: according to Newton, a solitary rotating sphere can be inferred to rotate about its axis relative to absolute space by observing the bulging of its equator, and a solitary pair of spheres tied by a rope can be inferred to be in absolute rotation about their center of gravity (barycenter) by observing the tension in the rope.

== Differing views ==
Two spheres orbiting around an axis. The spheres are distant enough for their effects on each other to be ignored, and they are held together by a rope. If the rope is under tension, it is because the bodies are rotating relative to absolute space according to Newton, or because they rotate relative to the universe itself according to Mach, or because they rotate relative to local geodesics according to general relativity.

Historically, there have been differing views on the concept of absolute space and time. Gottfried Leibniz was of the opinion that space made no sense except as the relative location of bodies, and time made no sense except as the relative movement of bodies. George Berkeley suggested that, lacking any point of reference, a sphere in an otherwise empty universe could not be conceived to rotate, and a pair of spheres could be conceived to rotate relative to one another, but not to rotate about their center of gravity, an example later raised by Albert Einstein in his development of general relativity.

A more recent form of these objections was made by Ernst Mach. Mach's principle proposes that mechanics is entirely about relative motion of bodies and, in particular, mass is an expression of such relative motion. So, for example, a single particle in a universe with no other bodies would have zero mass. According to Mach, Newton's examples simply illustrate relative rotation of spheres and the bulk of the universe.

When, accordingly, we say that a body preserves unchanged its direction and velocity in space, our assertion is nothing more or less than an abbreviated reference to the entire universe.
—Ernst Mach

These views opposing absolute space and time may be seen from a modern stance as an attempt to introduce operational definitions for space and time, a perspective made explicit in the special theory of relativity.

Even within the context of Newtonian mechanics, the modern view is that absolute space is unnecessary. Instead, the notion of inertial frame of reference has taken precedence, that is, a preferred set of frames of reference that move uniformly with respect to one another. The laws of physics transform from one inertial frame to another according to Galilean relativity, leading to the following objections to absolute space, as outlined by Milutin Blagojević:

- The existence of absolute space contradicts the internal logic of classical mechanics since, according to Galilean principle of relativity, none of the inertial frames can be singled out.
- Absolute space does not explain inertial forces since they are related to acceleration with respect to any one of the inertial frames.
- Absolute space acts on physical objects by inducing their resistance to acceleration but it cannot be acted upon.

Newton himself recognized the role of inertial frames.

The motions of bodies included in a given space are the same among themselves, whether that space is at rest or moves uniformly forward in a straight line.

As a practical matter, inertial frames often are taken as frames moving uniformly with respect to the fixed stars. See Inertial frame of reference for more discussion on this.

== Mathematical definitions ==
Space, as understood in Newtonian mechanics, is three-dimensional and Euclidean, with a fixed orientation. It is denoted E^{3}. If some point O in E^{3} is fixed and defined as an origin, the position of any point P in E^{3} is uniquely determined by its radius vector $\mathbf{r} = \vec{OP}$ (the origin of this vector coincides with the point O and its end coincides with the point P). The three-dimensional linear vector space R^{3} is a set of all radius vectors. The space R^{3} is endowed with a scalar product ⟨ , ⟩.

Time is a scalar which is the same in all space E^{3} and is denoted as t. The ordered set { t } is called a time axis.

Motion (also path or trajectory) is a function r : Δ → R^{3} that maps a point in the interval Δ from the time axis to a position (radius vector) in R^{3}.

The above four concepts are the "well-known" objects mentioned by Isaac Newton in his Principia:

I do not define time, space, place and motion, as being well known to all.

== Special relativity ==
The concepts of space and time were separate in physical theory prior to the advent of special relativity theory, which connected the two and showed both to be dependent upon the reference frame's motion. In Einstein's theories, the ideas of absolute time and space were superseded by the notion of spacetime in special relativity, and curved spacetime in general relativity.

Absolute simultaneity refers to the concurrence of events in time at different locations in space in a manner agreed upon in all frames of reference. The theory of relativity does not have a concept of absolute time because there is a relativity of simultaneity. An event that is simultaneous with another event in one frame of reference may be in the past or future of that event in a different frame of reference, which negates absolute simultaneity.

== Einstein ==
Quoted below from his later papers, Einstein identified the term aether with "properties of space", a terminology that is not widely used. Einstein stated that in general relativity the "aether" is not absolute anymore, as the geodesic and therefore the structure of spacetime depends on the presence of matter.

To deny the ether is ultimately to assume that empty space has no physical qualities whatever. The fundamental facts of mechanics do not harmonize with this view. For the mechanical behaviour of a corporeal system hovering freely in empty space depends not only on relative positions (distances) and relative velocities, but also on its state of rotation, which physically may be taken as a characteristic not appertaining to the system in itself. In order to be able to look upon the rotation of the system, at least formally, as something real, Newton objectivises space. Since he classes his absolute space together with real things, for him rotation relative to an absolute space is also something real. Newton might no less well have called his absolute space “Ether”; what is essential is merely that besides observable objects, another thing, which is not perceptible, must be looked upon as real, to enable acceleration or rotation to be looked upon as something real.

—

Albert Einstein, Ether and the Theory of Relativity (1920)

Because it was no longer possible to speak, in any absolute sense, of simultaneous states at different locations in the aether, the aether became, as it were, four-dimensional, since there was no objective way of ordering its states by time alone. According to special relativity too, the aether was absolute, since its influence on inertia and the propagation of light was thought of as being itself independent of physical influence....The theory of relativity resolved this problem by establishing the behaviour of the electrically neutral point-mass by the law of the geodetic line, according to which inertial and gravitational effects are no longer considered as separate. In doing so, it attached characteristics to the aether which vary from point to point, determining the metric and the dynamic behaviour of material points, and determined, in their turn, by physical factors, namely the distribution of mass/energy. Thus the aether of general relativity differs from those of classical mechanics and special relativity in that it is not ‘absolute’ but determined, in its locally variable characteristics, by ponderable matter.

—

Albert Einstein, Über den Äther (1924)

== General relativity ==
Special relativity eliminates absolute time (although Gödel and others suspect absolute time may be valid for some forms of general relativity) and general relativity further reduces the physical scope of absolute space and time through the concept of geodesics. There appears to be absolute space in relation to the distant stars because the local geodesics eventually channel information from these stars, but it is not necessary to invoke absolute space with respect to any system's physics, as its local geodesics are sufficient to describe its spacetime.

== See also ==
- Absolute rotation
- Absolute theory
- Apeiron
- Bucket argument
- Copernican principle
- Inertial frame of reference
- Luminiferous aether
- Mach's principle
- Philosophy of space and time
- Rotating spheres
- Time dilation
- Vacuum
