= Hoyle–Narlikar theory of gravity =

Comformal theory of gravity

The Hoyle–Narlikar theory of gravity is a Machian and conformal theory of gravity proposed by Fred Hoyle and Jayant Narlikar that originally fits into the quasi steady state model of the universe.

The gravitational constant G is arbitrary and is determined by the mean density of matter in the universe. The theory was inspired by the Wheeler–Feynman absorber theory for electrodynamics. When Richard Feynman, as a graduate student, lectured on the Wheeler–Feynman absorber theory in the weekly physics seminar at Princeton, Albert Einstein was in the audience and stated at question time that he was trying to achieve the same thing for gravity. Stephen Hawking showed in 1965 that the theory is incompatible with an expanding universe, because the Wheeler–Feynman advanced solution would diverge. However, at that time the accelerating expansion of the universe was not known, which resolves the divergence issue because of the cosmic event horizon.

The Hoyle–Narlikar theory reduces to Einstein's general relativity in the limit of a smooth fluid model of particle distribution constant in time and space. Hoyle–Narlikar's theory is consistent with some cosmological tests. Unlike the standard cosmological model, the quasi steady state hypothesis implies the universe is eternal. According to Narlikar, multiple mini bangs would occur at the center of quasars, with various creation fields (or C-field) continuously generating matter out of empty space due to local concentration of negative energy that would also prevent violation of conservation laws, in order to keep the mass density constant as the universe expands. The low-temperature cosmic background radiation would not originate from the Big Bang but from metallic dust made from supernovae, radiating the energy of stars. However, the quasi steady-state hypothesis is challenged by observation as it does not fit into WMAP data.

== See also ==
- Brans–Dicke theory
- Non-standard cosmology

== Bibliography ==
- Hoyle, Fred; Narlikar, Jayant V.; Freeman, W.H. (1974). Action at a distance in physics and cosmology. W. H. Freeman and Company. ISBN 978-0716703464.
- Hoyle, Fred; Narlikar, Jayant V. (1996). Lectures on Cosmology and Action at a Distance Electrodynamics. World Scientific. ISBN 978-9810225582.
- Hoyle, Fred; Burbidge, Geoffrey; Narlikar, Jayant V. (2000). A Different Approach to Cosmology: From a Static Universe through the Big Bang towards Reality. Cambridge University Press. ISBN 978-0521662239.
- Narlikar, Jayant V. (2002). An Introduction to Cosmology (3rd ed.). Cambridge University Press. ISBN 978-0521793766.
