= Galilean transformation =

Concept in physics and mathematics

In physics, a Galilean transformation is used to transform between the coordinates of two reference frames which differ only by constant relative motion within the constructs of Newtonian physics. These transformations together with spatial rotations and translations in space and time form the inhomogeneous Galilean group (assumed throughout below). Without the translations in space and time the group is the homogeneous Galilean group. The Galilean group is the group of motions of Galilean relativity acting on the four dimensions of space and time, forming the Galilean geometry. This is the passive transformation point of view. In special relativity the homogeneous and inhomogeneous Galilean transformations are, respectively, replaced by the Lorentz transformations and Poincaré transformations; conversely, the group contraction in the classical limit c → ∞ of Poincaré transformations yields Galilean transformations.

The equations below are only physically valid in a Newtonian framework, and not applicable to coordinate systems moving relative to each other at speeds approaching the speed of light.

Galileo formulated these concepts in his description of uniform motion. The topic was motivated by his description of the motion of a ball rolling down a ramp, by which he measured the numerical value for the acceleration of gravity near the surface of the Earth.

== Translation ==
Standard configuration of coordinate systems for Galilean transformations

Although the transformations are named for Galileo, it is the absolute time and space as conceived by Isaac Newton that provides their domain of definition. In essence, the Galilean transformations embody the intuitive notion of addition and subtraction of velocities as vectors.

The notation below describes the relationship under the Galilean transformation between the coordinates (x, y, z, t) and (x′, y′, z′, t′) of a single arbitrary event, as measured in two coordinate systems S and S′, in uniform relative motion (velocity v) in their common x and x′ directions, with their spatial origins coinciding at time t = t′ = 0:

$$x' = x - v t$$
$$y' = y$$
$$z' = z$$
$$t' = t .$$

Note that the last equation holds for all Galilean transformations up to addition of a constant, and expresses the assumption of a universal time independent of the relative motion of different observers.

In the language of linear algebra, this transformation is considered a shear mapping, and is described with a matrix acting on a vector. With motion parallel to the x-axis, the transformation acts on only two components:

$$\begin{pmatrix} x' \\t' \end{pmatrix} = \begin{pmatrix} 1 & -v \\0 & 1 \end{pmatrix}\begin{pmatrix} x \\t \end{pmatrix}$$

Though matrix representations are not strictly necessary for Galilean transformation, they provide the means for direct comparison to transformation methods in special relativity.

== Galilean transformations ==
The Galilean symmetries can be uniquely written as the composition of a rotation, a translation and a uniform motion of spacetime. Let x represent a point in three-dimensional space, and t a point in one-dimensional time. A general point in spacetime is given by an ordered pair (x, t).

A uniform motion, with velocity v, is given by

$$(\mathbf{x},t) \mapsto (\mathbf{x}+t\mathbf{v},t),$$

where v ∈ R^{3}. A translation is given by

$$(\mathbf{x},t) \mapsto (\mathbf{x}+\mathbf{a},t+s),$$

where a ∈ R^{3} and s ∈ R. A rotation is given by

$$(\mathbf{x},t) \mapsto (R\mathbf{x},t),$$

where R : R^{3} → R^{3} is an orthogonal transformation.

As a Lie group, the group of Galilean transformations has dimension 10.

== Galilean group ==
Two Galilean transformations G(R, v, a, s) and G(R' , v′, a′, s′) compose to form a third Galilean transformation,

G(R′, v′, a′, s′) ⋅ G(R, v, a, s) = G(R′ R, R′ v + v′, R′ a + a′ + v′ s, s′ + s).

The set of all Galilean transformations Gal(3) forms a group with composition as the group operation.

The group is sometimes represented as a matrix group with spacetime events (x, t, 1) as vectors where t is real and x ∈ R^{3} is a position in space. The action is given by

$$\begin{pmatrix}R & v & a \\ 0 & 1 & s \\ 0 & 0 & 1 \end{pmatrix} \begin{pmatrix}  x\\ t\\ 1\end{pmatrix}   = \begin{pmatrix}  R x+vt  +a\\ t+s\\   1\end{pmatrix},$$

where s is real and v, x, a ∈ R^{3} and R is a rotation matrix. The composition of transformations is then accomplished through matrix multiplication. Care must be taken in the discussion whether one restricts oneself to the connected component group of the orthogonal transformations.

Gal(3) has named subgroups. The identity component is denoted SGal(3).

Let m represent the transformation matrix with parameters v, R, s, a:

- $\{ m : R = I_3 \} ,$ anisotropic transformations.
- $\{ m : s = 0 \} ,$ isochronous transformations.
- $\{ m : s = 0, v = 0 \} ,$ spatial Euclidean transformations.
- $G_1 = \{ m : s = 0, a = 0 \},$ uniformly special transformations / homogeneous transformations, isomorphic to Euclidean transformations.
- $G_2 = \{ m : v = 0, R = I_3 \} \cong \left(\mathbf{R}^4, +\right),$ shifts of origin / translation in Newtonian spacetime.
- $G_3 = \{ m : s = 0, a = 0, v = 0 \} \cong \mathrm{SO}(3),$ rotations (of reference frame) (see SO(3)), a compact group.
- $G_4 = \{ m : s = 0, a = 0, R = I_3 \} \cong \left(\mathbf{R}^3, +\right),$ uniform frame motions / boosts.

The parameters s, v, R, a span ten dimensions. Since the transformations depend continuously on s, v, R, a, Gal(3) is a continuous group, also called a topological group.

The structure of Gal(3) can be understood by reconstruction from subgroups. The semidirect product combination ($A \rtimes B$) of groups is required.

1. $G_2 \triangleleft \mathrm{SGal}(3)$ (G_{2} is a normal subgroup)
2. $\mathrm{SGal}(3) \cong G_2 \rtimes G_1$
3. $G_4 \trianglelefteq G_1$
4. $G_1 \cong G_4 \rtimes G_3$
5. $\mathrm{SGal}(3) \cong \mathbf{R}^4 \rtimes (\mathbf{R}^3 \rtimes \mathrm{SO}(3)) .$

== Origin in group contraction ==
The Lie algebra of the Galilean group is spanned by H, P_{i}, C_{i} and L_{ij} (an antisymmetric tensor), subject to commutation relations, where

$$[H,P_i]=0$$
$$[P_i,P_j]=0$$
$$[L_{ij},H]=0$$
$$[C_i,C_j]=0$$
$$[L_{ij},L_{kl}]=i [\delta_{ik}L_{jl}-\delta_{il}L_{jk}-\delta_{jk}L_{il}+\delta_{jl}L_{ik}]$$
$$[L_{ij},P_k]=i[\delta_{ik}P_j-\delta_{jk}P_i]$$
$$[L_{ij},C_k]=i[\delta_{ik}C_j-\delta_{jk}C_i]$$
$$[C_i,H]=i P_i \,\!$$
$$[C_i,P_j]=0 ~.$$

H is the generator of time translations (Hamiltonian), P_{i} is the generator of translations (momentum operator), C_{i} is the generator of rotationless Galilean transformations (Galileian boosts), and L_{ij} stands for a generator of rotations (angular momentum operator).

This Lie Algebra is seen to be a special classical limit of the algebra of the Poincaré group, in the limit c → ∞. Technically, the Galilean group is a celebrated group contraction of the Poincaré group (which, in turn, is a group contraction of the de Sitter group SO(1,4)). Formally, renaming the generators of momentum and boost of the latter as in

P_{0} ↦ H / c
K_{i} ↦ c ⋅ C_{i},

where c is the speed of light (or any unbounded function thereof), the commutation relations (structure constants) in the limit c → ∞ take on the relations of the former. Generators of time translations and rotations are identified. Also note the group invariants L_{mn} L^{mn} and P_{i} P^{i}.

In matrix form, for d = 3, one may consider the regular representation (embedded in GL(5; R), from which it could be derived by a single group contraction, bypassing the Poincaré group),

$iH= \left( {\begin{array}{ccccc} 0 & 0 & 0 & 0 & 0\\ 0 & 0 & 0 & 0 & 0\\ 0 & 0 & 0 & 0 & 0\\ 0 & 0 & 0 & 0 & 1\\ 0 & 0 & 0 & 0 & 0\\ \end{array} } \right) , \qquad$ $i\vec{a}\cdot\vec{P}= \left( {\begin{array}{ccccc} 0&0&0&0 & a_1\\ 0&0&0&0 & a_2\\ 0&0&0&0 & a_3\\ 0 & 0 & 0 & 0& 0\\ 0 & 0 & 0 & 0 & 0\\ \end{array} } \right), \qquad$ $i\vec{v}\cdot\vec{C}= \left( {\begin{array}{ccccc} 0 & 0 & 0 & v_1 & 0\\ 0 & 0 & 0 & v_2 & 0\\ 0 & 0 & 0 & v_3 & 0\\ 0 & 0 & 0 & 0 & 0\\ 0 & 0 & 0 & 0 & 0\\ \end{array} } \right), \qquad$ $i \theta_i \epsilon^{ijk} L_{jk} = \left( {\begin{array}{ccccc} 0& \theta_3 & -\theta_2 & 0 & 0\\ -\theta_3 & 0 & \theta_1& 0 & 0\\ \theta_2 & -\theta_1 & 0 & 0 & 0\\ 0 & 0 & 0 & 0 & 0\\ 0 & 0 & 0 & 0 & 0\\ \end{array} } \right ) ~.$

The infinitesimal group element is then

$$G(R,\vec{v},\vec{a},s)=1\!\!1_5   +       \left( {\begin{array}{ccccc}
0& \theta_3 & -\theta_2 & v_1& a_1\\      -\theta_3 & 0 &  \theta_1& v_2 & a_2\\
\theta_2 & -\theta_1 & 0 & v_3 & a_3\\      0 & 0 & 0 & 0 & s\\
0 & 0 & 0 & 0 & 0\\     \end{array} } \right )  +\ ... ~.$$

== Central extension of the Galilean group ==
One may consider a central extension of the Lie algebra of the Galilean group, spanned by H′, P′_{i}, C′_{i}, L′_{ij} and an operator M: The so-called Bargmann algebra is obtained by imposing $[C'_i,P'_j]=i M\delta_{ij}$, such that M lies in the center, i.e. commutes with all other operators.

In full, this algebra is given as

$$[H',P'_i]=0 \,\!$$
$$[P'_i,P'_j]=0 \,\!$$
$$[L'_{ij},H']=0 \,\!$$
$$[C'_i,C'_j]=0 \,\!$$
$$[L'_{ij},L'_{kl}]=i [\delta_{ik}L'_{jl}-\delta_{il}L'_{jk}-\delta_{jk}L'_{il}+\delta_{jl}L'_{ik}] \,\!$$
$$[L'_{ij},P'_k]=i[\delta_{ik}P'_j-\delta_{jk}P'_i] \,\!$$
$$[L'_{ij},C'_k]=i[\delta_{ik}C'_j-\delta_{jk}C'_i] \,\!$$
$$[C'_i,H']=i P'_i \,\!$$

and finally

$$[C'_i,P'_j]=i M\delta_{ij} ~.$$

where the new parameter $M$ shows up. This extension and projective representations that this enables is determined by its group cohomology.

== See also ==
- Galilean invariance
- Representation theory of the Galilean group
- Galilei-covariant tensor formulation
- Poincaré group
- Lorentz group
- Lagrangian and Eulerian coordinates
