= Conformal supergravity =

Type of supergravity

In theoretical physics, conformal supergravity is the study of the supersymmetrized version of conformal gravity with Weyl transformations. Equivalently, it is the extension of ordinary supergravity to include Weyl transformations.

Often, nonconformal gravity is described by conformal gravity with a conformal compensator.
