= Conformal gravity =

Gravity theories that are invariant under Weyl transformations

Conformal gravity refers to gravity theories that are invariant under conformal transformations in the Riemannian geometry sense; more accurately, they are invariant under Weyl transformations $g_{ab}\rightarrow\Omega^2(x)g_{ab}$ where $g_{ab}$ is the metric tensor and $\Omega(x)$ is a function on spacetime.

== Weyl-squared theories ==
The simplest theory in this category has the square of the Weyl tensor as the Lagrangian

$$\mathcal{S}=\int \, \mathrm{d}^4x \, \sqrt{-g \;} \, C_{abcd}\,C^{abcd}~,$$

where $\; C_{abcd} \;$ is the Weyl tensor. This is to be contrasted with the usual Einstein–Hilbert action where the Lagrangian is just the Ricci scalar. The equation of motion upon varying the metric is called the Bach tensor,

$$2\,\partial_a\,\partial_d\,{{C^a}_{bc}}^d ~~+~~ R_{ad} \, {{C^a}_{bc}}^d ~=~ 0~,$$

where $\; R_{ab} \;$ is the Ricci tensor. Conformally flat metrics are solutions of this equation.

Since these theories lead to fourth-order equations for the fluctuations around a fixed background, they are not manifestly unitary. It has therefore been generally believed that they could not be consistently quantized. This is now disputed.

== Four-derivative theories ==
Conformal gravity is an example of a 4-derivative theory. This means that each term in the wave equation can contain up to four derivatives. There are pros and cons of 4-derivative theories. The pros are that the quantized version of the theory is more convergent and renormalisable. The cons are that there may be issues with causality. A simpler example of a 4-derivative wave equation is the scalar 4-derivative wave equation:

$$\operatorname{\Box}^2 \Phi =0$$

The solution for this in a central field of force is:

$$\Phi(r)= 1 - \frac{2m}{r} +ar +br^2$$

The first two terms are the same as a normal wave equation. Because this equation is a simpler approximation to conformal gravity, m corresponds to the mass of the central source. The last two terms are unique to 4-derivative wave equations. It has been suggested that small values be assigned to them to account for the galactic acceleration constant (also known as dark matter) and the dark energy constant. The solution equivalent to the Schwarzschild solution in general relativity for a spherical source for conformal gravity has a metric with:

$$\varphi(r) = g^{00}  = (1-6bc)^\frac{1}{2} - \frac{2b}{r} + c r + \frac{d}{3} r^2$$

to show the difference between general relativity. 6bc is very small, and so can be ignored. The additional parameters have been argued to explain galactic rotation curves without invoking dark matter.

The main issue with conformal gravity theories, as well as any theory with higher derivatives, is the typical presence of ghosts, which point to instabilities of the quantum version of the theory, although there might be a solution to the ghost problem.

An alternative approach is to consider the gravitational constant as a symmetry broken scalar field, in which case you would consider a small correction to Newtonian gravity like this (where we consider $\varepsilon$ to be a small correction):

$$\operatorname \Box \Phi + \varepsilon^2 \operatorname{\Box}^2 \Phi = 0$$

in which case the general solution is the same as the Newtonian case except there can be an additional term:

$$\Phi = 1 - \frac{2m}{r} \left( 1 + \alpha \sin\left(\frac r \varepsilon +\beta\right) \right)$$

where there is an additional component varying sinusoidally over space. The wavelength of this variation could be quite large, such as an atomic width. Thus there appear to be several stable potentials around a gravitational force in this model.

== Conformal unification to the Standard Model ==
By adding a suitable gravitational term to the Standard Model action in curved spacetime, the theory develops a local conformal (Weyl) invariance. The conformal gauge is fixed by choosing a reference mass scale based on the gravitational constant. This approach generates the masses for the vector bosons and matter fields similar to the Higgs mechanism without traditional spontaneous symmetry breaking.

== See also ==
- Conformal supergravity
- Hoyle–Narlikar theory of gravity
