= Galilean invariance =

Low-velocity approximation of special relativity

Galilean invariance or Galilean relativity states that the laws of motion are the same in all inertial frames of reference. Galileo Galilei first described this principle in 1632 in his Dialogue Concerning the Two Chief World Systems using the example of a ship travelling at constant velocity, without rocking, on a smooth sea; any observer below the deck would be unable to tell whether the ship was moving or stationary.

== Formulation ==
Specifically, the term Galilean invariance today usually refers to this principle as applied to Newtonian mechanics, that is, Newton's laws of motion hold in all frames related to one another by a Galilean transformation. In other words, all frames related to one another by such a transformation are inertial (meaning, Newton's equation of motion is valid in these frames). In this context it is sometimes called Newtonian relativity.

Among the axioms from Newton's theory are:

1. There exists an absolute space, in which Newton's laws are true. An inertial frame is a reference frame in relative uniform motion to absolute space.
2. All inertial frames share a universal time.

Galilean relativity can be shown as follows. Consider two inertial frames S and S' . A physical event in S will have position coordinates r = (x, y, z) and time t in S, and r' = (x' , y' , z' ) and time t' in S' . By the second axiom above, one can synchronize the clock in the two frames and assume t = t' . Suppose S' is in relative uniform motion to S with velocity v. Consider a point object whose position is given by functions r' (t) in S' and r(t) in S. We see that

$$r'(t) = r(t) - v t.\,$$

The velocity of the particle is given by the time derivative of the position:

$$u'(t) = \frac{d}{d t} r'(t) = \frac{d}{d t} r(t) - v = u(t) - v.$$

Another differentiation gives the acceleration in the two frames:

$$a'(t) = \frac{d}{d t} u'(t) = \frac{d}{d t} u(t) - 0 = a(t).$$

It is this simple but crucial result that implies Galilean relativity. Assuming that mass is invariant in all inertial frames, the above equation shows Newton's laws of mechanics, if valid in one frame, must hold for all frames. But it is assumed to hold in absolute space, therefore Galilean relativity holds.

=== Newton's theory versus special relativity ===
A comparison can be made between Newtonian relativity and special relativity.

Some of the assumptions and properties of Newton's theory are:

1. The existence of infinitely many inertial frames. Each frame is of infinite size (the entire universe may be covered by many linearly equivalent frames). Any two frames may be in relative uniform motion. (The relativistic nature of mechanics derived above shows that the absolute space assumption is not necessary.)
2. The inertial frames may move in all possible relative forms of uniform motion.
3. There is a universal, or absolute, notion of elapsed time.
4. Two inertial frames are related by a Galilean transformation.
5. In all inertial frames, Newton's laws, and gravity, hold.

In comparison, the corresponding statements from special relativity are as follows:

1. The existence, as well, of infinitely many non-inertial frames, each of which referenced to (and physically determined by) a unique set of spacetime coordinates. Each frame may be of infinite size, but its definition is always determined locally by contextual physical conditions. Any two frames may be in relative non-uniform motion (as long as it is assumed that this condition of relative motion implies a relativistic dynamical effect – and later, mechanical effect in general relativity – between both frames).
2. Rather than freely allowing all conditions of relative uniform motion between frames of reference, the relative velocity between two inertial frames becomes bounded above by the speed of light.
3. Instead of universal elapsed time, each inertial frame possesses its own notion of elapsed time.
4. The Galilean transformations are replaced by Lorentz transformations.
5. In all inertial frames, all laws of physics are the same.

Both theories assume the existence of inertial frames. In practice, the size of the frames in which they remain valid differ greatly, depending on gravitational tidal forces.

In the appropriate context, a local Newtonian inertial frame, where Newton's theory remains a good model, extends to roughly 10^{7} light years.

In special relativity, one considers Einstein's cabins, cabins that fall freely in a gravitational field. According to Einstein's thought experiment, a man in such a cabin experiences (to a good approximation) no gravity and therefore the cabin is an approximate inertial frame. However, one has to assume that the size of the cabin is sufficiently small so that the gravitational field is approximately parallel in its interior. This can greatly reduce the sizes of such approximate frames, in comparison to Newtonian frames. For example, an artificial satellite orbiting the Earth can be viewed as a cabin. However, reasonably sensitive instruments could detect "microgravity" in such a situation because the "lines of force" of the Earth's gravitational field converge.

In general, the convergence of gravitational fields in the universe dictates the scale at which one might consider such (local) inertial frames. For example, a spaceship falling into a black hole or neutron star would (at a certain distance) be subjected to tidal forces strong enough to crush it in width and tear it apart in length. In comparison, however, such forces might only be uncomfortable for the astronauts inside (compressing their joints, making it difficult to extend their limbs in any direction perpendicular to the gravity field of the star). Reducing the scale further, the forces at that distance might have almost no effects at all on a mouse. This illustrates the idea that all freely falling frames are locally inertial (acceleration and gravity-free) if the scale is chosen correctly.

=== Electromagnetism ===
There are two consistent Galilean transformations that may be used with electromagnetic fields in certain situations.

A transformation $T \{ *, v \}$ is not consistent if $T \{ *, v_1+v_2 \} \ne T \{ *, v_1 \} + T \{ *, v_2 \}$ where $v_1$ and $v_2$ are velocities. A consistent transformation will produce the same results when transforming to a new velocity in one step or multiple steps. It is not possible to have a consistent Galilean transformation that transforms both the magnetic and electric fields. There are useful consistent Galilean transformations that may be applied whenever either the magnetic field or the electric field is dominant.

==== Magnetic field system ====
Magnetic field systems are those systems in which the electric field in the initial frame of reference is insignificant, but the magnetic field is strong. When the magnetic field is dominant and the relative velocity, $v^\mathbf{r}$, is low, then the following transformation may be useful:

$$\begin{align}
\mathbf{H^'} &= \mathbf{H} \\
\mathbf{J_f^'} &= \mathbf{J_f} \\
\mathbf{B^'} &= \mathbf{B} \\
\mathbf{M^'} &= \mathbf{M} \\
\mathbf{E^'} &= \mathbf{E} +  v^\mathbf{r} \times \mathbf{B} \\
\end{align}$$
where $\mathbf{J_f}$ is free current density, $\mathbf{M}$ is magnetization density. The electric field is transformed under this transformation when changing frames of reference, but the magnetic field and related quantities are unchanged. An example of this situation is a wire is moving in a magnetic field such as would occur in an ordinary generator or motor. The transformed electric field in the moving frame of reference could induce current in the wire.

==== Electric field system ====
Electric field systems are those systems in which the magnetic field in the initial frame of reference is insignificant, but the electric field is strong. When the electric field is dominant and the relative velocity, $v^r$, is low, then the following transformation may be useful:

$$\begin{align}
\mathbf{E^'} &= \mathbf{E} \\
\mathbf{D^'} &= \mathbf{D} \\
\mathbf{\rho_f^'} &= \mathbf{\rho_f} \\
\mathbf{P^'} &= \mathbf{P} \\
\mathbf{H^'} &= \mathbf{H} -  v^\mathbf{r} \times \mathbf{D} \\
\mathbf{J_f^'} &= \mathbf{J_f} - \rho_\mathbf{f} v^\mathbf{r} \\
\end{align}$$

where $\rho_\mathbf{f}$ is free charge density, $\mathbf{P}$ is polarization density. The magnetic field and free current density are transformed under this transformation when changing frames of reference, but the electric field and related quantities are unchanged

== Work, kinetic energy, and momentum ==
Because the distance covered while applying a force to an object depends on the inertial frame of reference, so depends the work done. Due to Newton's law of reciprocal actions there is a reaction force; it does work depending on the inertial frame of reference in an opposite way. The total work done is independent of the inertial frame of reference.

Correspondingly the kinetic energy of an object, and even the change in this energy due to a change in velocity, depends on the inertial frame of reference. The total kinetic energy of an isolated system also depends on the inertial frame of reference: it is the sum of the total kinetic energy in a center-of-momentum frame and the kinetic energy the total mass would have if it were concentrated in the center of mass. Due to the conservation of momentum the latter does not change with time, so changes with time of the total kinetic energy do not depend on the inertial frame of reference.

By contrast, while the momentum of an object also depends on the inertial frame of reference, its change due to a change in velocity does not.

== See also ==
- Absolute space and time
- Faster-than-light
- Galilei-covariant tensor formulation (no relation to Galileo)
- Superluminal motion
