= Euler equations (fluid dynamics) =

Set of quasilinear hyperbolic equations governing adiabatic and inviscid flow

Flow around a wing. This incompressible flow satisfies the Euler equations.

In fluid dynamics, the Euler equations are a set of partial differential equations governing adiabatic and inviscid flow. They are named after Leonhard Euler. In particular, they correspond to the Navier–Stokes equations with zero viscosity and zero thermal conductivity.

The Euler equations can be applied to incompressible and compressible flows. The incompressible Euler equations consist of Cauchy equations for conservation of mass and balance of momentum, together with the incompressibility condition that the flow velocity is divergence-free. The compressible Euler equations consist of equations for conservation of mass, balance of momentum, and balance of energy, together with a suitable constitutive equation for the specific energy density of the fluid. Historically, only the equations of conservation of mass and balance of momentum were derived by Euler. However, fluid dynamics literature often refers to the full set of the compressible Euler equations – including the energy equation – as "the compressible Euler equations".

The mathematical characters of the incompressible and compressible Euler equations are rather different. For constant fluid density, the incompressible equations can be written as a quasilinear advection equation for the fluid velocity together with an elliptic Poisson's equation for the pressure. On the other hand, the compressible Euler equations form a quasilinear hyperbolic system of conservation equations.

The Euler equations can be formulated in a "convective form" (also called the "Lagrangian form") or a "conservation form" (also called the "Eulerian form"). The convective form emphasizes changes to the state in a frame of reference moving with the fluid. The conservation form emphasizes the mathematical interpretation of the equations as conservation equations for a control volume fixed in space (which is useful from a numerical point of view).

== History ==
The Euler equations first appeared in published form in Euler's article "Principes généraux du mouvement des fluides", published in Mémoires de l'Académie des Sciences de Berlin in 1757 (although Euler had previously presented his work to the Berlin Academy in 1752). Prior work included contributions from the Bernoulli family as well as from Jean le Rond d'Alembert.

The Euler equations were among the first partial differential equations to be written down, after the wave equation. In Euler's original work, the system of equations consisted of the momentum and continuity equations, and thus was underdetermined except in the case of an incompressible flow. An additional equation, which was called the adiabatic condition, was supplied by Pierre-Simon Laplace in 1816.

During the second half of the 19th century, it was found that the equation related to the balance of energy must at all times be kept for compressible flows, and the adiabatic condition is a consequence of the fundamental laws in the case of smooth solutions. With the discovery of the special theory of relativity, the concepts of energy density, momentum density, and stress were unified into the concept of the stress–energy tensor, and energy and momentum were likewise unified into a single concept, the energy–momentum vector.

== Incompressible Euler equations with constant and uniform density ==
In convective form (i.e., the form with the convective operator made explicit in the momentum equation), the incompressible Euler equations in the case of density constant in time and uniform in space are:

Incompressible Euler equations with constant and uniform density
(convective or Lagrangian form)

$$\frac{D\mathbf{u}}{Dt}=-\nabla w+\mathbf{g},
\qquad
\nabla\cdot\mathbf{u}=0$$

where:

- $\mathbf{u}$ is the flow velocity vector field, with components in an N-dimensional space $u_1,u_2,\dots,u_N$,
- $\frac{D\mathbf{u}}{Dt}=\frac{\partial\mathbf{u}}{\partial t}+(\mathbf{u}\cdot\nabla)\mathbf{u}$ is the material derivative of $\mathbf{u}$, describing the acceleration of the fluid,
- $\mathbf{g}$ represents body accelerations (force per unit mass) acting on the fluid, for example acceleration due to gravity, electric fields, and so on,
- $\nabla w$ is the gradient of the specific pressure potential $w$,
- $\nabla\cdot\mathbf{u}$ is the divergence of the flow velocity vector field.

The first equation is the Euler momentum equation with uniform density. By expanding the material derivative, the equations become:

$$\frac{\partial\mathbf{u}}{\partial t}+(\mathbf{u}\cdot\nabla)\mathbf{u}
=-\nabla w+\mathbf{g}$$

$$\nabla\cdot\mathbf{u}=0$$

For a flow with uniform density $\rho_0$, the specific pressure potential is defined by:

$$w=\frac{p}{\rho_0}.$$

Consequently,

$$\nabla w
=\nabla\left(\frac{p}{\rho_0}\right)
=\frac{1}{\rho_0}\nabla p.$$

where $p$ is the mechanical pressure.

The second equation is the incompressible constraint, stating that the flow velocity is a solenoidal field. For an incompressible flow, the density of a fluid parcel remains constant along its motion. When the density is also uniform in space, this gives the divergence-free condition $\nabla\cdot\mathbf{u}=0$.

The continuity equation is

$$\frac{\partial\rho}{\partial t}
+\nabla\cdot(\rho\mathbf{u})=0.$$

For constant density $\rho=\rho_0$, this reduces to:

$$\nabla\cdot\mathbf{u}=0$$

Thus, in the constant-density incompressible case, the continuity equation is equivalent to the incompressibility constraint and does not need to be introduced as an independent additional equation.

The equations above represent respectively conservation of mass (1 scalar equation) and momentum (1 vector equation containing $N$ scalar components, where $N$ is the physical dimension of the space of interest). Flow velocity and pressure are the principal physical variables.

In a coordinate system given by $(x_1,\dots,x_N)$, the velocity and external force vectors $\mathbf{u}$ and $\mathbf{g}$ have components $(u_1,\dots,u_N)$ and $(g_1,\dots,g_N)$, respectively. Then the equations may be expressed in subscript notation as:

$$\frac{\partial u_i}{\partial t}
+\sum_{j=1}^{N}
\frac{\partial\left(u_i u_j+w\delta_{ij}\right)}{\partial x_j}
=g_i.$$

$$\sum_{i=1}^{N}
\frac{\partial u_i}{\partial x_i}
=0.$$

where the $i$ and $j$ subscripts label the N-dimensional space components, and $\delta_{ij}$ is the Kronecker delta. The use of Einstein notation (where the sum is implied by repeated indices instead of sigma notation) is also frequent.

=== Properties ===
Although Euler first presented these equations in 1755, many fundamental questions concerning their mathematical properties remain open. In particular, the regularity and possible finite-time singularity formation of solutions of the three-dimensional incompressible Euler equations remain important questions in mathematical fluid dynamics.

In three spatial dimensions, there are special classes of solutions for which finite-time singularity formation has been established.

Smooth solutions of the free equations, in the sense of equations without a source term $\mathbf{g}=0$, satisfy conservation of kinetic energy. The local conservation law is:

$$\frac{\partial}{\partial t}\left(\frac{1}{2}u^2\right)
+\nabla\cdot\left(\left(\frac{1}{2}u^2+w\right)\mathbf{u}\right)=0.$$

Here $u^2=\mathbf{u}\cdot\mathbf{u}$. The conservation law follows from the momentum equation together with the divergence-free condition.

In the one-dimensional case without the source term and with no pressure gradient, the momentum equation becomes the inviscid Burgers' equation:

$$\frac{\partial u}{\partial t}
+u\frac{\partial u}{\partial x}=0.$$

The inviscid Burgers equation is a fundamental model for nonlinear advection and conservation laws.

=== Nondimensionalisation ===
In order to make the equations dimensionless, a characteristic length $r_0$ and a characteristic velocity $u_0$ need to be defined. These should be chosen such that the dimensionless variables are of order one. The following dimensionless variables are thus obtained:

$$u^*\equiv\frac{u}{u_0},
\qquad
r^*\equiv\frac{r}{r_0},
\qquad
t^*\equiv\frac{u_0}{r_0}t,
\qquad
w^*\equiv\frac{w}{u_0^2},
\qquad
\nabla^*\equiv r_0\nabla.$$

For the direction of the external field, define the unit vector:

$$\hat{\mathbf{g}}\equiv\frac{\mathbf{g}}{g}.$$

The Froude number is defined as:

$$\mathrm{Fr}=\frac{u_0}{\sqrt{g r_0}}.$$

Substitution of the dimensionless variables into the Euler equations and omission of the asterisks gives:

Incompressible Euler equations with constant and uniform density
(nondimensional form)

$$\frac{D\mathbf{u}}{Dt}
=-\nabla w+\frac{1}{\mathrm{Fr}^2}\hat{\mathbf{g}}.$$

$$\nabla\cdot\mathbf{u}=0.$$

The Froude number compares inertial effects with gravitational effects in fluid flow. A high Froude number corresponds to a regime in which the effect of gravity is relatively small.

The incompressible Euler equations with constant density can also be written in dimensional form as:

$$\frac{D\mathbf{u}}{Dt}
=-\nabla w+\mathbf{g}.$$

$$\nabla\cdot\mathbf{u}=0.$$

In the absence of an external field, $\mathbf{g}=0$, the Euler equations are homogeneous and can be written in conservation form.

=== Conservation form ===
The conservation form emphasizes the mathematical structure of the Euler equations and is particularly important in computational fluid dynamics. Conservative formulations are widely used in numerical methods for conservation laws and fluid dynamics.

For the free Euler equations, the momentum equation can be written as a conservation equation:

$$\frac{\partial\mathbf{u}}{\partial t}
+\nabla\cdot\left(\mathbf{u}\otimes\mathbf{u}+w\mathbf{I}\right)
=\mathbf{0}.$$

Together with the incompressibility constraint:

$$\nabla\cdot\mathbf{u}=0.$$

In Einstein notation, the same equations are:

$$\frac{\partial u_j}{\partial t}
+\frac{\partial}{\partial x_i}
\left(u_i u_j+w\delta_{ij}\right)
=0.$$

$$\frac{\partial u_i}{\partial x_i}=0.$$

where $\mathbf{I}$ is the identity matrix and $\otimes$ denotes the outer product.

=== Demonstration of the conservation form ===
For the divergence-free velocity field, the following identity holds:

$$(\mathbf{u}\cdot\nabla)\mathbf{u}
=\nabla\cdot(\mathbf{u}\otimes\mathbf{u}).$$

In index notation:

$$u_i\frac{\partial u_j}{\partial x_i}
=\frac{\partial}{\partial x_i}(u_i u_j).$$

This follows from the product rule and the incompressibility condition:

$$\frac{\partial}{\partial x_i}(u_i u_j)
=u_j\frac{\partial u_i}{\partial x_i}
+u_i\frac{\partial u_j}{\partial x_i}
=u_i\frac{\partial u_j}{\partial x_i}.$$

Similarly, because the identity tensor is constant in Cartesian coordinates:

$$\nabla\cdot(w\mathbf{I})=\nabla w.$$

In index notation:

$$\frac{\partial}{\partial x_i}(w\delta_{ij})
=\delta_{ij}\frac{\partial w}{\partial x_i}
=\frac{\partial w}{\partial x_j}.$$

Consequently, the momentum equation without an external field,

$$\frac{\partial\mathbf{u}}{\partial t}
+(\mathbf{u}\cdot\nabla)\mathbf{u}
=-\nabla w,$$

can be rewritten as:

$$\frac{\partial\mathbf{u}}{\partial t}
+\nabla\cdot\left(\mathbf{u}\otimes\mathbf{u}+w\mathbf{I}\right)
=\mathbf{0}.$$

This is the conservation, or Eulerian, form of the incompressible Euler momentum equation.

The system can be represented using a conservation variable $\mathbf{y}$ and a flux matrix $\mathbf{F}$. The components of $\mathbf{y}$ are:

$$y_i=u_i
\qquad
(i=1,\dots,N),$$

and:

$$y_{N+1}=0.$$

The components of the flux matrix corresponding to the momentum equations are:

$$F_{ij}=u_i u_j+w\delta_{ij}
\qquad
(i=1,\dots,N;\ j=1,\dots,N).$$

The final row represents the incompressibility constraint:

$$F_{N+1,j}=u_j
\qquad
(j=1,\dots,N).$$

Thus, in three dimensions, the conservation variables are:

$$y_1=u_1,
\qquad
y_2=u_2,
\qquad
y_3=u_3,
\qquad
y_4=0.$$

The components of the corresponding flux matrix are:

$$F_{11}=u_1^2+w,
\qquad
F_{12}=u_1u_2,
\qquad
F_{13}=u_1u_3.$$

$$F_{21}=u_2u_1,
\qquad
F_{22}=u_2^2+w,
\qquad
F_{23}=u_2u_3.$$

$$F_{31}=u_3u_1,
\qquad
F_{32}=u_3u_2,
\qquad
F_{33}=u_3^2+w.$$

$$F_{41}=u_1,
\qquad
F_{42}=u_2,
\qquad
F_{43}=u_3.$$

For the equations with an external field, the momentum conservation equation takes the component form:

$$\frac{\partial y_j}{\partial t}
+\frac{\partial F_{ij}}{\partial x_i}
=g_j
\qquad
(j=1,\dots,N).$$

The additional constraint has zero source term:

$$\frac{\partial y_{N+1}}{\partial t}
+\frac{\partial F_{N+1,i}}{\partial x_i}
=0.$$

Since $y_{N+1}=0$ and $F_{N+1,i}=u_i$, this equation is precisely:

$$\frac{\partial u_i}{\partial x_i}=0.$$

The conservation-law formulation of the Euler equations and its use in numerical methods are discussed by Toro.

=== Spatial dimensions ===
The Euler equations can be formulated in one, two, or three spatial dimensions. The one-dimensional equations are useful in simplified models and in certain problems involving approximately one-dimensional flow.

In one spatial dimension, the incompressible Euler equations reduce to:

$$\frac{\partial u}{\partial t}
+u\frac{\partial u}{\partial x}
=-\frac{\partial w}{\partial x}+g.$$

The incompressibility constraint becomes:

$$\frac{\partial u}{\partial x}=0.$$

For the one-dimensional free equation with no pressure gradient, the momentum equation reduces to the inviscid Burgers' equation:

$$\frac{\partial u}{\partial t}
+u\frac{\partial u}{\partial x}=0.$$

In multiple spatial dimensions, the Euler equations contain one momentum equation for each spatial component of the velocity field. Numerical methods for the equations make extensive use of conservation laws, flux formulations, and, for suitable problems, the method of characteristics.

== Incompressible Euler equations ==
In convective form the incompressible Euler equations in case of density variable in space are:

Incompressible Euler equations
(convective or Lagrangian form)

$$\begin{align}
{D\rho \over Dt} &= 0\\
{D\mathbf{u} \over Dt} &= -\frac{\nabla p}{\rho} + \mathbf{g} \\
\nabla \cdot \mathbf{u} &= 0
\end{align}$$

where the additional variables are:

- $\rho$ is the fluid mass density,
- $p$ is the pressure, $p = \rho w$.

The first equation, which is the new one, is the incompressible continuity equation. In fact the general continuity equation would be:
$${\partial \rho \over\partial t} + \mathbf u \cdot \nabla \rho +  \rho \nabla \cdot \mathbf u  = 0,$$

but here the last term is identically zero for the incompressibility constraint.

=== Conservation form ===
The incompressible Euler equations in the Froude limit are equivalent to a single conservation equation with conserved quantity and associated flux respectively:
$$\mathbf y = \begin{pmatrix}\rho  \\  \rho \mathbf u  \\0\end{pmatrix}; \qquad {\mathbf F} = \begin{pmatrix}\rho \mathbf u \\ \rho \mathbf u \otimes \mathbf u + p \mathbf I\\\mathbf u\end{pmatrix}.$$

Here $\mathbf y$ has length $N+2$ and $\mathbf F$ has size $(N+2)N$. (Note: In 3D for example $\mathbf y$ has length 5, $\mathbf I$ has size 3×3 and $\mathbf F$ has size 5×3, so the explicit forms are: $${\mathbf y}=\begin{pmatrix}\rho \\  \rho u_1 \\ \rho u_2  \\ \rho u_3  \\0\end{pmatrix}; \quad {\mathbf F}=\begin{pmatrix}\rho u_1 & \rho u_2 & \rho u_3 \\ \rho u_1^2 + p &  \rho u_1u_2 &  \rho u_1u_3 \\  \rho u_1 u_2 & \rho u_2^2 + p &  \rho u_2u_3 \\ \rho u_3 u_1 &  \rho u_3 u_2 &  \rho u_3^2 + p \\ u_1 & u_2 & u_3 \end{pmatrix}.$$) In general (not only in the Froude limit) Euler equations are expressible as:
$$\frac {\partial}{\partial t}\begin{pmatrix}\rho  \\  \rho \mathbf u  \\0\end{pmatrix}+ \nabla \cdot \begin{pmatrix}\rho \mathbf u\\\rho \mathbf u \otimes \mathbf u + p \mathbf I\\ \mathbf u\end{pmatrix} = \begin{pmatrix}0 \\  \rho \mathbf g \\ 0 \end{pmatrix}.$$

=== Conservation variables ===
The variables for the equations in conservation form are not yet optimised. In fact we could define:
$${\mathbf y}=\begin{pmatrix}\rho  \\ \mathbf j  \\0\end{pmatrix}; \qquad {\mathbf F}=\begin{pmatrix} \mathbf j \\ \mathbf j \otimes \frac {1} \rho \, \mathbf j+ p \mathbf I\\ \frac \mathbf j \rho \end{pmatrix},$$
where $\mathbf j = \rho \mathbf u$ is the momentum density, a conservation variable.

Incompressible Euler equation(s)
(conservation or Eulerian form)

$$\frac {\partial}{\partial t}\begin{pmatrix}\rho  \\  \mathbf j  \\0\end{pmatrix}+ \nabla \cdot \begin{pmatrix}\mathbf j \\ \mathbf j \otimes \frac 1 \rho \, \mathbf j + p \mathbf I\\ \frac \mathbf j \rho\end{pmatrix} = \begin{pmatrix}0 \\  \mathbf f \\ 0 \end{pmatrix}$$

where $\mathbf f = \rho \mathbf g$ is the force density, a conservation variable.

== Euler equations ==
In differential convective form, the compressible (and most general) Euler equations can be written shortly with the material derivative notation:

Euler equations
(convective form)

$$\begin{align}
{D\rho \over Dt} &= -\rho\nabla \cdot \mathbf{u} \\[1.2ex]
\frac{D\mathbf{u}}{Dt} &= -\frac{\nabla p}{\rho} + \mathbf{g} \\[1.2ex]
{De \over Dt} &= -\frac{p}{\rho}\nabla \cdot \mathbf{u}
\end{align}$$

where the additional variable here is:

- $e$ is the specific internal energy (internal energy per unit mass).

The equations above thus represent conservation of mass, momentum, and energy: the energy equation expressed in the variable internal energy allows to understand the link with the incompressible case, but it is not in the simplest form. Mass density, flow velocity and pressure are the so-called convective variables (or physical variables, or lagrangian variables), while mass density, momentum density and total energy density are the so-called conserved variables (also called eulerian, or mathematical variables).

If one expands the material derivative, the equations above become:
$$\begin{align}
{\partial\rho \over \partial t} + \mathbf{u} \cdot \nabla\rho + \rho\nabla \cdot \mathbf{u} &= 0,\\[1.2ex]
\frac{\partial\mathbf{u}}{\partial t} + \mathbf{u} \cdot \nabla\mathbf{u} + \frac{\nabla p}{\rho} &= \mathbf{g}, \\[1.2ex]
{\partial e \over \partial t} + \mathbf{u} \cdot \nabla e + \frac{p}{\rho}\nabla \cdot \mathbf{u} &= 0.
\end{align}$$

=== Incompressible constraint (revisited) ===
Coming back to the incompressible case, it now becomes apparent that the incompressible constraint typical of the former cases actually is a particular form valid for incompressible flows of the energy equation, and not of the mass equation. In particular, the incompressible constraint corresponds to the following very simple energy equation:
$$\frac{D e}{D t} = 0.$$

Thus for an incompressible inviscid fluid the specific internal energy is constant along the flow lines, also in a time-dependent flow. The pressure in an incompressible flow acts like a Lagrange multiplier, being the multiplier of the incompressible constraint in the energy equation, and consequently in incompressible flows it has no thermodynamic meaning. In fact, thermodynamics is typical of compressible flows and degenerates in incompressible flows.

Basing on the mass conservation equation, one can put this equation in the conservation form:
$${\partial \rho e \over \partial t} + \nabla \cdot (\rho e \mathbf u) = 0,$$
meaning that for an incompressible inviscid nonconductive flow a continuity equation holds for the internal energy.

=== Enthalpy conservation ===
Since by definition the specific enthalpy is:
$$h = e + \frac p \rho.$$

The material derivative of the specific internal energy can be expressed as:
$${D e \over Dt} = {D h \over Dt} - \frac 1 \rho \left({D p \over Dt} - \frac p \rho {D \rho \over Dt} \right).$$

Then by substituting the momentum equation in this expression, one obtains:
$${D e \over Dt}= {D h \over Dt} - \frac 1 \rho \left(p \nabla \cdot \mathbf u + {D p \over Dt} \right).$$

And by substituting the latter in the energy equation, one obtains that the enthalpy expression for the Euler energy equation:
$${D h \over Dt} = \frac 1 \rho {D p \over Dt}.$$
In a reference frame moving with an inviscid and nonconductive flow, the variation of enthalpy directly corresponds to a variation of pressure.

=== Thermodynamics of ideal fluids ===
In thermodynamics the independent variables are the specific volume, and the specific entropy, while the specific energy is a function of state of these two variables.

Deduction of the form valid for thermodynamic systems

Considering the first equation, variable must be changed from density to specific volume. By definition:
$$v \equiv \frac 1 \rho$$

Thus the following identities hold:
$$\nabla \rho = \nabla \left(\frac{1}{v}\right) = -\frac{1}{v^2} \nabla v$$
$$\frac{\partial\rho}{\partial t} = \frac{\partial}{\partial t} \left(\frac{1}{v}\right) = -\frac{1}{v^2} \frac{\partial v}{\partial t}$$

Then by substituting these expressions in the mass conservation equation:
$$- \frac{\mathbf{u}}{v^2} \cdot \nabla v - \frac 1 {v^2} \frac {\partial v}{\partial t} = - \frac 1 v \nabla \cdot \mathbf{u}$$

And by multiplication:
$${\partial v \over\partial t}+\mathbf u \cdot \nabla v = v \nabla \cdot \mathbf u$$

This equation is the only belonging to general continuum equations, so only this equation have the same form for example also in Navier-Stokes equations.

On the other hand, the pressure in thermodynamics is the opposite of the partial derivative of the specific internal energy with respect to the specific volume:
$$p(v, s) = - {\partial e(v, s) \over \partial v}$$
since the internal energy in thermodynamics is a function of the two variables aforementioned, the pressure gradient contained into the momentum equation should be explicited as:
$$- \nabla p (v,s) = - \frac {\partial p}{\partial v} \nabla v - \frac {\partial p}{\partial s} \nabla s = \frac {\partial^2 e}{\partial v^2} \nabla v +  \frac {\partial^2 e}{\partial v \partial s}\nabla s$$

It is convenient for brevity to switch the notation for the second order derivatives:
$$- \nabla p (v,s) =  e_{vv} \nabla v + e_{vs} \nabla s$$

Finally, the energy equation:
$${D e \over Dt} = - p v \nabla \cdot \mathbf u$$
can be further simplified in convective form by changing variable from specific energy to the specific entropy: in fact the first law of thermodynamics in local form can be written:
$${D e \over Dt} = T {D s \over Dt} - p {D v \over Dt}$$
by substituting the material derivative of the internal energy, the energy equation becomes:
$$T {D s \over Dt} + \frac p {\rho^2} \left( {D \rho \over Dt} + \rho \nabla \cdot \mathbf u \right) = 0$$
now the term between parenthesis is identically zero according to the conservation of mass, then the Euler energy equation becomes simply:
$${D s \over Dt} = 0$$

For a thermodynamic fluid, the compressible Euler equations are consequently best written as:

Euler equations
(convective form, for a thermodynamic system)

$$\begin{align}
{Dv \over Dt} &= v \nabla \cdot \mathbf u\\[1.2ex]
\frac{D\mathbf{u}}{Dt} &= ve_{vv}\nabla v + ve_{vs}\nabla s + \mathbf{g} \\[1.2ex]
{Ds \over Dt} &= 0
\end{align}$$

where:

- $v$ is the specific volume
- $\mathbf u$ is the flow velocity vector
- $s$ is the specific entropy

In the general case and not only in the incompressible case, the energy equation means that for an inviscid thermodynamic fluid the specific entropy is constant along the flow lines, also in a time-dependent flow. Basing on the mass conservation equation, one can put this equation in the conservation form:
$${\partial \rho s \over \partial t} + \nabla \cdot (\rho s \mathbf u) = 0,$$
meaning that for an inviscid nonconductive flow a continuity equation holds for the entropy.

On the other hand, the two second-order partial derivatives of the specific internal energy in the momentum equation require the specification of the fundamental equation of state of the material considered, i.e. of the specific internal energy as function of the two variables specific volume and specific entropy:
$$e = e(v, s).$$

The fundamental equation of state contains all the thermodynamic information about the system (Callen, 1985), exactly like the couple of a thermal equation of state together with a caloric equation of state.

=== Conservation form ===
The Euler equations in the Froude limit are equivalent to a single conservation equation with conserved quantity and associated flux respectively:
$$\mathbf y = \begin{pmatrix}
\rho \\
\mathbf j \\
E^t
\end{pmatrix}; \qquad {\mathbf F} = \begin{pmatrix}
\mathbf j \\
\frac 1 \rho \mathbf j \otimes \mathbf j + p \mathbf I \\
\left(E^t + p\right) \frac{1}{\rho}\mathbf{j}
\end{pmatrix},$$

where:

- $\mathbf j = \rho \mathbf u$ is the momentum density, a conservation variable.
- $E^t = \rho e + \frac{1}{2} \rho u^2$ is the total energy density (total energy per unit volume).

Here $\mathbf y$ has length N + 2 and $\mathbf F$ has size N(N + 2). (Note: In 3D for example y has length 5, I has size 3×3 and F has size 3×5, so the explicit forms are: $${\mathbf y} = \begin{pmatrix} j_1 \\ j_2  \\ j_3 \end{pmatrix}; \quad {\mathbf F} = \begin{pmatrix} j_1 &                    j_2 &                    j_3 \\ \frac{j_1^2}{\rho} + p & \frac{j_1j_2}{\rho}    & \frac{j_1j_3}{\rho}    \\ \frac{j_1j_2}{\rho}    & \frac{j_2^2}{\rho} + p & \frac{j_2j_3}{\rho}    \\ \frac{j_3j_1}{\rho}    & \frac{j_3j_2}{\rho}    & \frac{j_3^2}{\rho} + p \\ \left(E^t + p\right) \frac{j_1}{\rho} & \left(E^t + p\right) \frac{j_2}{\rho} & \left(E^t + p\right) \frac{j_3}{\rho} \end{pmatrix}.$$) In general (not only in the Froude limit) Euler equations are expressible as:

Euler equation(s)
(original conservation or Eulerian form)

$$\frac{\partial}{\partial t}\begin{pmatrix}
\rho \\
\mathbf{j} \\
E^t
\end{pmatrix} + \nabla \cdot \begin{pmatrix}
\mathbf{j} \\
\frac{1}{\rho}\mathbf{j} \otimes \mathbf{j} + p \mathbf{I} \\
\left(E^t + p\right) \frac{1}{\rho}\mathbf{j}
\end{pmatrix} = \begin{pmatrix}
0 \\
\mathbf f \\
\frac{1}{\rho}\mathbf{j} \cdot \mathbf{f}
\end{pmatrix}$$

where $\mathbf f = \rho \mathbf g$ is the force density, a conservation variable.

The Euler equations, even when conservatived (no external field, Froude limit), have no Riemann invariants in general. Some further assumptions are required

However, already mentioned was that for a thermodynamic fluid the equation for the total energy density is equivalent to the conservation equation:
$${\partial \over \partial t} (\rho s) + \nabla \cdot (\rho s \mathbf u) = 0.$$

Then the conservation equations in the case of a thermodynamic fluid are more simply expressed as:

Euler equation(s)
(conservation form, for thermodynamic fluids)

$$\frac{\partial}{\partial t}\begin{pmatrix}\rho  \\  \mathbf{j} \\S \end{pmatrix} + \nabla \cdot \begin{pmatrix}\mathbf{j} \\ \frac{1}{\rho}\mathbf{j} \otimes \mathbf{j} + p\mathbf{I} \\ S\frac{\mathbf{j}}{\rho}\end{pmatrix} =
\begin{pmatrix}0 \\ \mathbf{f} \\ 0 \end{pmatrix}$$

where $S = \rho s$ is the entropy density, a thermodynamic conservation variable.

Another possible form for the energy equation, being particularly useful for isobarics, is:
$$\frac{\partial H^t}{\partial t} + \nabla \cdot \left(H^t \mathbf u\right) =
\mathbf u \cdot \mathbf f - \frac{\partial p}{\partial t},$$
where $H^t = E^t + p = \rho e + p + \frac{1}{2} \rho u^2$ is the total enthalpy density.

== Quasilinear form and characteristic equations ==
Expanding the fluxes can be an important part of constructing numerical solvers, for example by exploiting (approximate) solutions to the Riemann problem. In regions where the state vector y varies smoothly, the equations in conservative form can be put in quasilinear form:
$$\frac{\partial \mathbf y}{\partial t} + \mathbf A_i \frac{\partial \mathbf y}{\partial r_i}  = {\mathbf 0}.$$
where $\mathbf A_i$ are called the flux Jacobians defined as the matrices:
$$\mathbf A_i (\mathbf y)=\frac{\partial \mathbf f_i (\mathbf y)}{\partial \mathbf y}.$$

This Jacobian does not exist where the state variables are discontinuous, as at contact discontinuities or shocks.

=== Characteristic equations ===
The compressible Euler equations can be decoupled into a set of N+2 wave equations that describes sound in Eulerian continuum if they are expressed in characteristic variables instead of conserved variables.

In fact the tensor A is always diagonalizable. If the eigenvalues (the case of Euler equations) are all real the system is defined hyperbolic, and physically eigenvalues represent the speeds of propagation of information. If they are all distinguished, the system is defined strictly hyperbolic (it will be proved to be the case of one-dimensional Euler equations). Furthermore, diagonalisation of compressible Euler equation is easier when the energy equation is expressed in the variable entropy (i.e. with equations for thermodynamic fluids) than in other energy variables. This will become clear by considering the 1D case.

If $\mathbf p_i$ is the right eigenvector of the matrix $\mathbf A$ corresponding to the eigenvalue $\lambda_i$, by building the projection matrix:
$$\mathbf{P} = \left[\mathbf{p}_1, \mathbf{p}_2, ..., \mathbf{p}_n\right].$$

One can finally find the characteristic variables as:
$$\mathbf{w} = \mathbf{P}^{-1} \mathbf{y}.$$

Since A is constant, multiplying the original 1-D equation in flux-Jacobian form with P^{−1} yields the characteristic equations:
$$\frac{\partial w_i}{\partial t} + \lambda_j \frac{\partial w_i}{\partial r_j} = 0_i.$$

The original equations have been decoupled into N+2 characteristic equations each describing a simple wave, with the eigenvalues being the wave speeds. The variables w_{i} are called the characteristic variables and are a subset of the conservative variables. The solution of the initial value problem in terms of characteristic variables is finally very simple. In one spatial dimension it is:
$$w_i(x, t) = w_i\left(x - \lambda_i t, 0\right).$$

Then the solution in terms of the original conservative variables is obtained by transforming back:
$$\mathbf{y} = \mathbf{P} \mathbf{w},$$
this computation can be made explicit as the linear combination of the eigenvectors:
$$\mathbf{y}(x, t) = \sum_{i=1}^m w_i\left(x - \lambda_i t, 0\right) \mathbf p_i.$$

Now it becomes apparent that the characteristic variables act as weights in the linear combination of the jacobian eigenvectors. The solution can be seen as superposition of waves, each of which is advected independently without change in shape. Each i-th wave has shape w_{i}p_{i} and speed of propagation λ_{i}. In the following we show a very simple example of this solution procedure.

=== Waves in 1D inviscid, nonconductive thermodynamic fluid ===
If one considers Euler equations for a thermodynamic fluid with the two further assumptions of one spatial dimension and free (no external field: g = 0):
$$\begin{align}
{\partial v \over \partial t} + u{\partial v \over \partial x} - v {\partial u \over \partial x} &= 0,\\[1.2ex]
{\partial u \over \partial t} + u{\partial u \over \partial x} - e_{vv} v {\partial v \over \partial x} - e_{vs}v {\partial s \over \partial x} &= 0,\\[1.2ex]
{\partial s \over \partial t} + u{\partial s \over \partial x} &= 0.
\end{align}$$

If one defines the vector of variables:
$$\mathbf{y} = \begin{pmatrix}v \\ u \\ s\end{pmatrix},$$
recalling that $v$ is the specific volume, $u$ the flow speed, $s$ the specific entropy, the corresponding jacobian matrix is:
$${\mathbf A}=\begin{pmatrix}u & -v & 0 \\ - e_{vv} v & u & - e_{vs} v \\ 0 & 0 & u \end{pmatrix}.$$

At first one must find the eigenvalues of this matrix by solving the characteristic equation:
$$\det(\mathbf A(\mathbf y) - \lambda(\mathbf y) \mathbf I) = 0,$$

that is explicitly:
$$\det\begin{bmatrix}u-\lambda & -v & 0 \\ - e_{vv} v & u-\lambda & - e_{vs} v \\ 0 & 0 & u-\lambda \end{bmatrix}=0.$$

This determinant is very simple: the fastest computation starts on the last row, since it has the highest number of zero elements.
$$(u-\lambda) \det \begin{bmatrix}u-\lambda & -v \\ - e_{vv} v & u -\lambda \end{bmatrix}=0.$$

Now by computing the determinant 2×2:
$$(u - \lambda)\left((u - \lambda)^2 - e_{vv} v^2\right) = 0,$$
by defining the parameter:
$$a(v,s) \equiv v \sqrt {e_{vv}},$$
or equivalently in mechanical variables, as:
$$a(\rho,p) \equiv \sqrt {\partial p \over \partial \rho}.$$

This parameter is always real according to the second law of thermodynamics. In fact the second law of thermodynamics can be expressed by several postulates. The most elementary of them in mathematical terms is the statement of convexity of the fundamental equation of state, i.e. the hessian matrix of the specific energy expressed as function of specific volume and specific entropy:
$$\begin{pmatrix}e_{vv} & e_{vs} \\ e_{vs} & e_{ss} \end{pmatrix},$$
is defined positive. This statement corresponds to the two conditions:
$$\left\{\begin{align}
e_{vv} &> 0 \\[1.2ex]
e_{vv}e_{ss} - e_{vs}^2 &> 0
\end{align}\right.$$

The first condition is the one ensuring the parameter a is defined real.

The characteristic equation finally results:
$$(u - \lambda)\left((u - \lambda)^2 - a^2\right) = 0$$

That has three real solutions:
$$\lambda_1(v,u,s) = u-a(v,s), \qquad \lambda_2(u)= u, \qquad \lambda_3(v,u,s) = u+a(v,s).$$

Then the matrix has three real eigenvalues all distinguished: the 1D Euler equations are a strictly hyperbolic system.

At this point one should determine the three eigenvectors: each one is obtained by substituting one eigenvalue in the eigenvalue equation and then solving it. By substituting the first eigenvalue λ_{1} one obtains:
$$\begin{pmatrix}a  & -v & 0 \\ - e_{vv} v & a & - e_{vs} v \\ 0 & 0 & a \end{pmatrix} \begin{pmatrix}v_1\\ u_1  \\s_1 \end{pmatrix}=0.$$

Basing on the third equation that simply has solution s_{1}=0, the system reduces to:
$$\begin{pmatrix}a  & -v \\-a^2 /v& a  \end{pmatrix} \begin{pmatrix}v_1\\ u_1 \end{pmatrix}=0$$

The two equations are redundant as usual, then the eigenvector is defined with a multiplying constant. We choose as right eigenvector:
$$\mathbf p_1=\begin{pmatrix}v\\ a  \\0\end{pmatrix}.$$

The other two eigenvectors can be found with analogous procedure as:
$$\mathbf p_2=\begin{pmatrix} e_{vs} \\ 0\\ - \left(\frac a v \right)^2 \end{pmatrix}, \qquad \mathbf p_3 = \begin{pmatrix}v\\ -a \\0\end{pmatrix}.$$

Then the projection matrix can be built:
$$\mathbf P (v,u,s)=( \mathbf{p}_1, \mathbf{p}_2, \mathbf{p}_3) =\begin{pmatrix} v & e_{vs} & v\\ a & 0 & -a \\ 0 &  - \left(\frac a v \right)^2 & 0 \end{pmatrix}.$$

Finally it becomes apparent that the real parameter a previously defined is the speed of propagation of the information characteristic of the hyperbolic system made of Euler equations, i.e. it is the wave speed. It remains to be shown that the sound speed corresponds to the particular case of an isentropic transformation:
$$a_s \equiv \sqrt {\left({\partial p \over \partial \rho} \right)_s}.$$

=== Compressibility and sound speed ===
Sound speed is defined as the wavespeed of an isentropic transformation:
$$a_s(\rho,p) \equiv \sqrt {\left({\partial p \over \partial \rho} \right)_s},$$
by the definition of the isoentropic compressibility:
$$K_s (\rho,p) \equiv \rho \left({\partial p \over \partial \rho} \right)_s,$$
the soundspeed results always the square root of ratio between the isentropic compressibility and the density:
$$a_s \equiv \sqrt {\frac {K_s} \rho}.$$

==== Ideal gas ====
The sound speed in an ideal gas depends only on its temperature:
$$a_s (T) = \sqrt {\gamma \frac T m}.$$

Deduction of the form valid for ideal gases

In an ideal gas the isoentropic transformation is described by the Poisson's law:
$$d\left(p\rho^{-\gamma}\right)_s = 0$$
where γ is the heat capacity ratio, a constant for the material. By explicitating the differentials:

$$\rho^{-\gamma} (d p)_s + \gamma p \rho^{-\gamma-1} (d \rho)_s =0$$

and by dividing for ρ^{−γ} dρ:

$$\left({\partial p \over \partial \rho}\right)_s = \gamma p \rho$$

Then by substitution in the general definitions for an ideal gas the isentropic compressibility is simply proportional to the pressure:

$$K_s (p) = \gamma p$$

and the sound speed results (Newton–Laplace law):

$$a_s (\rho,p) = \sqrt {\gamma \frac p \rho}$$

Notably, for an ideal gas the ideal gas law holds, that in mathematical form is simply:

$$p = n T$$

where n is the number density, and T is the absolute temperature, provided it is measured in energetic units (i.e. in joules) through multiplication with the Boltzmann constant. Since the mass density is proportional to the number density through the average molecular mass m of the material:

$$\rho = m n$$

The ideal gas law can be recast into the formula:

$$\frac p \rho = \frac T m$$

By substituting this ratio in the Newton–Laplace law, the expression of the sound speed into an ideal gas as function of temperature is finally achieved.

Since the specific enthalpy in an ideal gas is proportional to its temperature:

$$h = c_p  T = \frac {\gamma}{\gamma-1} \frac T m,$$

the sound speed in an ideal gas can also be made dependent only on its specific enthalpy:

$$a_s (h) = \sqrt {(\gamma -1) h} .$$

== Bernoulli's theorem for steady inviscid flow ==
Bernoulli's theorem is a direct consequence of the Euler equations.

=== Incompressible case and Lamb's form ===
The vector calculus identity of the cross product of a curl holds:

$$\mathbf{v \  \times } \left( \mathbf{ \nabla \times F} \right) = \nabla_F \left( \mathbf{v \cdot F } \right) - \mathbf{v \cdot \nabla } \mathbf{ F} \ ,$$

where the Feynman subscript notation $\nabla_F$ is used, which means the subscripted gradient operates only on the factor $\mathbf F$.

Lamb in his famous classical book Hydrodynamics (1895), still in print, used this identity to change the convective term of the flow velocity in rotational form:

$$\mathbf u \cdot \nabla \mathbf u = \frac{1}{2}\nabla\left(u^2\right) + (\nabla \times \mathbf u) \times \mathbf u,$$

the Euler momentum equation in Lamb's form becomes:

$$\frac{\partial\mathbf{u}}{\partial t} + \frac{1}{2}\nabla\left(u^2\right) + (\nabla \times \mathbf{u}) \times \mathbf{u} + \frac{\nabla p}{\rho} = \mathbf{g} =
\frac{\partial\mathbf{u}}{\partial t} + \frac{1}{2}\nabla\left(u^2\right) - \mathbf{u} \times (\nabla \times \mathbf{u}) + \frac{\nabla p}{\rho}.$$

Now, basing on the other identity:

$$\nabla \left( \frac {p}{\rho} \right) = \frac {\nabla p}{\rho} - \frac{p}{\rho^2} \nabla \rho,$$

the Euler momentum equation assumes a form that is optimal to demonstrate Bernoulli's theorem for steady flows:

$$\nabla \left(\frac{1}{2}u^2 + \frac{p}{\rho}\right) - \mathbf g =  -\frac{p}{\rho^2} \nabla \rho + \mathbf u \times (\nabla \times \mathbf u) - \frac{\partial \mathbf u}{\partial t}.$$

In fact, in case of an external conservative field, by defining its potential φ:

$$\nabla \left( \frac 1 2 u^2 + \phi + \frac p \rho \right)  = -\frac{p}{\rho^2} \nabla \rho  + \mathbf u \times (\nabla \times \mathbf u) - \frac{\partial \mathbf u}{\partial t}.$$

In case of a steady flow the time derivative of the flow velocity disappears, so the momentum equation becomes:

$$\nabla  \left( \frac 1 2 u^2 + \phi + \frac p \rho \right) =  -\frac{p}{\rho^2} \nabla \rho  + \mathbf u \times (\nabla \times \mathbf u).$$

And by projecting the momentum equation on the flow direction, i.e. along a streamline, the cross product disappears because its result is always perpendicular to the velocity:

$$\mathbf u \cdot \nabla \left(\frac{1}{2}u^2 + \phi + \frac{p}{\rho}\right) = -\frac{p}{\rho^2} \mathbf u \cdot \nabla\rho.$$

In the steady incompressible case the mass equation is simply:

$$\mathbf u \cdot \nabla \rho = 0,$$
that is the mass conservation for a steady incompressible flow states that the density along a streamline is constant. Then the Euler momentum equation in the steady incompressible case becomes:

$$\mathbf u \cdot \nabla \left( \frac 1 2 u^2 + \phi + \frac p \rho \right)  = 0.$$

The convenience of defining the total head for an inviscid liquid flow is now apparent:

$$b_l \equiv \frac 1 2 u^2 + \phi + \frac p \rho ,$$

which may be simply written as:

$$\mathbf u \cdot \nabla b_l = 0.$$

That is, the momentum balance for a steady inviscid and incompressible flow in an external conservative field states that the total head along a streamline is constant.

=== Compressible case ===
In the most general steady (compressible) case the mass equation in conservation form is:

$$\nabla \cdot \mathbf j = \rho \nabla \cdot \mathbf u + \mathbf u \cdot \nabla \rho = 0.$$
Therefore, the previous expression is rather

$$\mathbf{u} \cdot \nabla \left({\frac{1}{2}}u^2 + \phi + \frac{p}{\rho}\right) = \frac{p}{\rho}\nabla \cdot \mathbf{u}.$$

The right-hand side appears on the energy equation in convective form, which on the steady state reads:

$$\mathbf u \cdot \nabla  e =  - \frac{p}{\rho}  \nabla \cdot \mathbf u.$$

The energy equation therefore becomes:

$$\mathbf u \cdot \nabla \left( e + \frac p \rho + \frac 1 2 u^2 + \phi \right) = 0,$$

so that the internal specific energy now features in the head.

Since the external field potential is usually small compared to the other terms, it is convenient to group the latter ones in the total enthalpy:

$$h^t \equiv e + \frac p \rho + \frac 1 2 u^2,$$

and the Bernoulli invariant for an inviscid gas flow is:

$$b_g \equiv h^t + \phi = b_l + e ,$$

which can be written as:

$$\mathbf u \cdot \nabla b_g = 0.$$

That is, the energy balance for a steady inviscid flow in an external conservative field states that the sum of the total enthalpy and the external potential is constant along a streamline.

In the usual case of small potential field, simply:

$$\mathbf u \cdot \nabla h^t \sim 0.$$

=== Friedmann form and Crocco form ===
By substituting the pressure gradient with the entropy and enthalpy gradient, according to the first law of thermodynamics in the enthalpy form:

$$v \nabla p = -T \nabla s + \nabla h,$$

in the convective form of Euler momentum equation, one arrives to:

$$\frac{D\mathbf u}{Dt}=T \nabla\,s-\nabla \,h.$$

Friedmann deduced this equation for the particular case of a perfect gas and published it in 1922. However, this equation is general for an inviscid nonconductive fluid and no equation of state is implicit in it.

On the other hand, by substituting the enthalpy form of the first law of thermodynamics in the rotational form of Euler momentum equation, one obtains:

$$\frac{\partial\mathbf{u}}{\partial t} + \frac{1}{2} \nabla\left(u^2\right) + (\nabla \times \mathbf{u}) \times \mathbf{u} + \frac{\nabla p}{\rho} = \mathbf{g},$$

and by defining the specific total enthalpy:

$$h^t = h + \frac{1}{2}u^2,$$

one arrives to the Crocco–Vazsonyi form (Crocco, 1937) of the Euler momentum equation:

$$\frac{\partial \mathbf{ u}}{\partial t} + (\nabla \times \mathbf u) \times  \mathbf u  - T \nabla s + \nabla h^t = \mathbf{g}.$$

In the steady case the two variables entropy and total enthalpy are particularly useful since Euler equations can be recast into the Crocco's form:

$$\begin{align}
\mathbf{u} \times \nabla \times \mathbf{u} + T\nabla s - \nabla h^t &= \mathbf{g},\\
\mathbf{u} \cdot \nabla s &= 0, \\
\mathbf{u} \cdot \nabla h^t &= 0.
\end{align}$$

Finally if the flow is also isothermal:

$$T \nabla s = \nabla (T s),$$

by defining the specific total Gibbs free energy:

$$g^t \equiv h^t + Ts,$$

the Crocco's form can be reduced to:

$$\begin{align}
\mathbf{u} \times \nabla \times \mathbf{u} - \nabla g^t &= \mathbf{g},\\
\mathbf{u} \cdot \nabla g^t &= 0.
\end{align}$$

From these relationships one deduces that the specific total free energy is uniform in a steady, irrotational, isothermal, isoentropic, inviscid flow.

== Discontinuities ==
The Euler equations are quasilinear hyperbolic equations and their general solutions are waves. Under certain assumptions they can be simplified leading to Burgers' equation. Much like the familiar oceanic waves, waves described by the Euler Equations 'break' and so-called shock waves are formed; this is a nonlinear effect and represents the solution becoming multi-valued. Physically this represents a breakdown of the assumptions that led to the formulation of the differential equations, and to extract further information from the equations we must go back to the more fundamental integral form. Then, weak solutions are formulated by working in 'jumps' (discontinuities) into the flow quantities – density, velocity, pressure, entropy – using the Rankine–Hugoniot equations. Physical quantities are rarely discontinuous; in real flows, these discontinuities are smoothed out by viscosity and by heat transfer. (See Navier–Stokes equations)

Shock propagation is studied – among many other fields – in aerodynamics and rocket propulsion, where sufficiently fast flows occur.

To properly compute the continuum quantities in discontinuous zones (for example shock waves or boundary layers) from the local forms (Note: Sometimes the local and the global forms are also called respectively differential and non-differential, but this is not appropriate in all cases. For example, this is appropriate for Euler equations, while it is not for Navier-Stokes equations since in their global form there are some residual spatial first-order derivative operators in all the characteristic transport terms that in the local form contains second-order spatial derivatives.) (all the above forms are local forms, since the variables being described are typical of one point in the space considered, i.e. they are local variables) of Euler equations through finite difference methods generally too many space points and time steps would be necessary for the memory of computers now and in the near future. In these cases it is mandatory to avoid the local forms of the conservation equations, passing some weak forms, like the finite volume one.

=== Rankine–Hugoniot equations ===
Starting from the simplest case, one consider a steady free conservation equation in conservation form in the space domain:

$$\nabla \cdot \mathbf F = \mathbf 0,$$

where in general F is the flux matrix. By integrating this local equation over a fixed volume V_{m}, it becomes:

$$\int_{V_m} \nabla \cdot \mathbf F \,dV = \mathbf 0.$$

Then, basing on the divergence theorem, we can transform this integral in a boundary integral of the flux:

$$\oint_{\partial V_m} \mathbf F \,ds = \mathbf 0.$$

This global form simply states that there is no net flux of a conserved quantity passing through a region in the case steady and without source. In 1D the volume reduces to an interval, its boundary being its extrema, then the divergence theorem reduces to the fundamental theorem of calculus:

$$\int_{x_m}^{x_{m+1}} \mathbf F(x') \,dx' = \mathbf 0,$$

that is the simple finite difference equation, known as the jump relation:

$$\Delta \mathbf F = \mathbf 0.$$

That can be made explicit as:

$$\mathbf F_{m+1} - \mathbf F_m = \mathbf 0,$$

where the notation employed is:

$$\mathbf F_{m} = \mathbf F(x_m).$$

Or, if one performs an indefinite integral:

$$\mathbf F - \mathbf F_0 = \mathbf 0.$$

On the other hand, a transient conservation equation:

$${\partial y \over \partial t} + \nabla \cdot \mathbf F = \mathbf 0 ,$$

brings to a jump relation:

$$\frac{dx}{dt} \, \Delta u = \Delta \mathbf F.$$

For one-dimensional Euler equations the conservation variables and the flux are the vectors:

$$\mathbf y = \begin{pmatrix} \frac{1}{v} \\ j \\ E^t \end{pmatrix},$$
$$\mathbf F = \begin{pmatrix} j \\ v j^2 + p \\ v j \left(E^t + p\right) \end{pmatrix},$$

where:

- $v$ is the specific volume,
- $j$ is the mass flux.

In the one dimensional case the correspondent jump relations, called the Rankine–Hugoniot equations, are:

$$\begin{align}
\frac{dx}{dt}\Delta \left(\frac{1}{v}\right) &= \Delta j,\\[1.2ex]
\frac{dx}{dt} \Delta j &= \Delta(vj^2 + p),\\[1.2ex]
\frac{dx}{dt}\Delta E^t &= \Delta(jv(E^t + p)).
\end{align}$$

In the steady one dimensional case the become simply:

$$\begin{align}
\Delta j &= 0,\\[1.2ex]
\Delta\left(v j^2 + p\right) &= 0,\\[1.2ex]
\Delta\left(j\left(\frac{E^t}{\rho} + \frac{p}{\rho}\right)\right) &= 0.
\end{align}$$

Thanks to the mass difference equation, the energy difference equation can be simplified without any restriction:

$$\begin{align}
\Delta j &= 0, \\[1.2ex]
\Delta\left(vj^2 + p\right) &= 0, \\[1.2ex]
\Delta h^t &= 0,
\end{align}$$

where $h^t$ is the specific total enthalpy.

These are the usually expressed in the convective variables:

$$\begin{align}
\Delta j &= 0, \\[1.2ex]
\Delta\left(\frac{u^2}{v} + p\right) &= 0, \\[1.2ex]
\Delta\left(e + \frac{1}{2}u^2 + pv\right) &= 0,
\end{align}$$

where:

- $u$ is the flow speed
- $e$ is the specific internal energy.

The energy equation is an integral form of the Bernoulli equation in the compressible case. The former mass and momentum equations by substitution lead to the Rayleigh equation:

$$\frac{\Delta p}{\Delta v} = - \frac {u_0^2}{v_0}.$$

Since the second term is a constant, the Rayleigh equation always describes a simple line in the pressure volume plane not dependent of any equation of state, i.e. the Rayleigh line. By substitution in the Rankine–Hugoniot equations, that can be also made explicit as:

$$\begin{align}
\rho u &= \rho_0 u_0, \\[1.2ex]
\rho u^2 + p &= \rho_0 u_0^2 + p_0, \\[1.2ex]
e + \frac{1}{2}u^2 + \frac{p}{\rho} &= e_0 + \frac{1}{2}u_0^2 + \frac{p_0}{\rho_0}.
\end{align}$$

One can also obtain the kinetic equation and to the Hugoniot equation. The analytical passages are not shown here for brevity.

These are respectively:

$$\begin{align}
u^2(v, p) &= u_0^2 + (p - p_0)(v_0 + v), \\[1.2ex]
e(v, p) &= e_0 + \tfrac{1}{2} (p + p_0)(v_0 - v).
\end{align}$$

The Hugoniot equation, coupled with the fundamental equation of state of the material:

$$e = e(v,p),$$

describes in general in the pressure volume plane a curve passing by the conditions (v_{0}, p_{0}), i.e. the Hugoniot curve, whose shape strongly depends on the type of material considered.

It is also customary to define a Hugoniot function:

$$\mathfrak h (v,s) \equiv e(v,s) - e_0 + \tfrac{1}{2} (p(v,s) + p_0)(v - v_0),$$

allowing to quantify deviations from the Hugoniot equation, similarly to the previous definition of the hydraulic head, useful for the deviations from the Bernoulli equation.

=== Finite volume form ===
On the other hand, by integrating a generic conservation equation:

$$\frac {\partial \mathbf y}{\partial t} + \nabla \cdot \mathbf F = \mathbf s,$$

on a fixed volume V_{m}, and then basing on the divergence theorem, it becomes:

$$\frac {d}{dt} \int_{V_m} \mathbf y dV + \oint_{\partial V_m} \mathbf F \cdot \hat n ds = \mathbf S .$$

By integrating this equation also over a time interval:

$$\int_{V_m} \mathbf y(\mathbf r, t_{n+1}) \, dV - \int_{V_m} \mathbf y(\mathbf r, t_n) \, dV+ \int_{t_n}^{t_{n+1}} \oint_{\partial V_m} \mathbf F \cdot \hat n \, ds \, dt = \mathbf 0 .$$

Now by defining the node conserved quantity:

$$\mathbf y_{m,n} \equiv \frac 1 {V_m} \int_{V_m} \mathbf y(\mathbf r, t_n) \, dV ,$$

we deduce the finite volume form:

$$\mathbf{y}_{m,n+1}=\mathbf{y}_{m,n} - \frac{1}{V_m} \int_{t_n}^{t_{n+1}} \oint_{\partial V_m} \mathbf{F} \cdot \hat{n}\, ds \, dt .$$

In particular, for Euler equations, once the conserved quantities have been determined, the convective variables are deduced by back substitution:

$$\begin{align}
\displaystyle  \mathbf u_{m,n} &= \frac{\mathbf j_{m,n}}{\rho_{m,n}}, \\[1.2ex]
\displaystyle          e_{m,n} &= \frac{E^t_{m,n}}{\rho_{m,n}} - \frac{1}{2} u^2_{m,n}.
\end{align}$$

Then the explicit finite volume expressions of the original convective variables are:

Euler equations
(Finite volume form)

$$\begin{align}
\rho_{m,n+1} &= \rho_{m,n} - \frac{1}{V_m}\int_{t_n}^{t_{n+1}}\oint_{\partial V_m}\rho\mathbf{u} \cdot \hat{n}\, ds\, dt \\[1.2ex]
\mathbf u_{m,n+1} &= \mathbf u_{m,n} - \frac{1}{\rho_{m,n} V_m}\int_{t_n}^{t_{n+1}}\oint_{\partial V_m} (\rho\mathbf{u} \otimes \mathbf{u} - p\mathbf{I}) \cdot \hat{n}\, ds\, dt \\[1.2ex]
\mathbf e_{m,n+1} &= \mathbf e_{m,n} - \frac{1}{2}\left(u^2_{m,n+1} - u^2_{m,n}\right) - \frac{1}{\rho_{m,n} V_m}\int_{t_n}^{t_{n+1}}\oint_{\partial V_m} \left(\rho e + \frac{1}{2}\rho u^2 + p\right)\mathbf{u} \cdot \hat{n}\, ds\, dt \\[1.2ex]
\end{align}$$

== Constraints ==
It has been shown that Euler equations are not a complete set of equations, but they require some additional constraints to admit a unique solution: these are the equation of state of the material considered. To be consistent with thermodynamics these equations of state should satisfy the two laws of thermodynamics. On the other hand, by definition non-equilibrium system are described by laws lying outside these laws. In the following we list some very simple equations of state and the corresponding influence on Euler equations.

=== Ideal polytropic gas ===
For an ideal polytropic gas the fundamental equation of state is:

$$e(v, s) = e_0 e^{(\gamma-1)m\left(s-s_0\right)} \left({v_0 \over v}\right)^{\gamma-1},$$

where $e$ is the specific energy, $v$ is the specific volume, $s$ is the specific entropy, $m$ is the molecular mass, $\gamma$ here is considered a constant (polytropic process), and can be shown to correspond to the heat capacity ratio. This equation can be shown to be consistent with the usual equations of state employed by thermodynamics.

Demonstration of consistency with the thermodynamics of an ideal gas

By the thermodynamic definition of temperature:

$$T(e) \equiv {\partial e \over \partial s} = (\gamma - 1) m e$$

Where the temperature is measured in energy units. At first, note that by combining these two equations one can deduce the ideal gas law:

$$p v = m T,$$

or, in the usual form:

$$p = n T,$$

where: $n \equiv \frac m v$ is the number density of the material. On the other hand the ideal gas law is less strict than the original fundamental equation of state considered.

Now consider the molar heat capacity associated to a process x:

$$c_x = \left(m T {\partial s \over \partial T}\right)_x$$

according to the first law of thermodynamics:

$$d e(v,s)=-p dv + T \, ds$$

it can be simply expressed as:

$$c_x \equiv m \left({\partial e \over \partial T}\right)_x + m p \left({\partial v \over \partial T}\right)_x$$

Now inverting the equation for temperature T(e) we deduce that for an ideal polytropic gas the isochoric heat capacity is a constant:

$$c_v \equiv m \left({\partial e \over \partial T}\right)_v = m {d e \over dT} = \frac {1}{(\gamma -1)}$$

and similarly for an ideal polytropic gas the isobaric heat capacity results constant:

$$c_p \equiv m \left({\partial e \over \partial T}\right)_p + m p  \left({\partial v \over \partial T}\right)_p = m {d e \over dT} + p \left({\partial v \over \partial T}\right)_p = \frac {1}{(\gamma -1)} + 1$$

This brings to two important relations between heat capacities: the constant gamma actually represents the heat capacity ratio in the ideal polytropic gas:

$$\frac {c_p}{c_v}= \gamma$$

and one also arrives to the Meyer's relation:

$$c_p = c_v+1$$

The specific energy is then, by inverting the relation T(e):

$$e(T) = \frac {mT} {\gamma - 1} = c_v m T$$

The specific enthalpy results by substitution of the latter and of the ideal gas law:

$$h(T) \equiv e(T) + (p v)(T) = c_v m T + m T = c_p m T$$

From this equation one can derive the equation for pressure by its thermodynamic definition:

$$p(v,e) \equiv - {\partial e \over \partial v} = (\gamma - 1) \frac e v.$$

By inverting it one arrives to the mechanical equation of state:

$$e(v,p) = \frac {pv}{\gamma - 1}.$$

Then for an ideal gas the compressible Euler equations can be simply expressed in the mechanical or primitive variables specific volume, flow velocity and pressure, by taking the set of the equations for a thermodynamic system and modifying the energy equation into a pressure equation through this mechanical equation of state. At last, in convective form they result:

Euler equations for an ideal polytropic gas
(convective form)

$$\begin{align}
{Dv \over Dt} &= v\nabla \cdot \mathbf{u} \\[1.2ex]
\frac{D\mathbf{u}}{Dt} &= v\nabla p + \mathbf{g} \\[1.2ex]
{Dp \over Dt} &= -\gamma p\nabla \cdot \mathbf{u}
\end{align}$$

and in one-dimensional quasilinear form they results:

$$\frac{\partial \mathbf y}{\partial t} + \mathbf A \frac{\partial \mathbf y}{\partial x}  = {\mathbf 0}.$$

where the conservative vector variable is:

$${\mathbf y}=\begin{pmatrix}v\\ u  \\p \end{pmatrix},$$

and the corresponding jacobian matrix is:

$${\mathbf A}=\begin{pmatrix}u & -v & 0 \\ 0 & u & v \\ 0 & \gamma p & u \end{pmatrix}.$$

=== Steady flow in material coordinates ===
In the case of steady flow, it is convenient to choose the Frenet–Serret frame along a streamline as the coordinate system for describing the steady momentum Euler equation:
$$\boldsymbol{u}\cdot\nabla \boldsymbol{u} = - \frac{1}{\rho} \nabla p,$$

where $\mathbf u$, $p$ and $\rho$ denote the flow velocity, the pressure and the density, respectively.

Let $\left\{ \mathbf e_s, \mathbf e_n, \mathbf e_b \right\}$ be a Frenet–Serret orthonormal basis which consists of a tangential unit vector, a normal unit vector, and a binormal unit vector to the streamline, respectively. Since a streamline is a curve that is tangent to the velocity vector of the flow, the left-hand side of the above equation, the convective derivative of velocity, can be described as follows:
$$\boldsymbol{u}\cdot\nabla \boldsymbol{u}= u\frac{\partial}{\partial s}(u\boldsymbol{e}_s) = u\frac{\partial u}{\partial s}\boldsymbol{e}_s + \frac{u^2}{R}\boldsymbol{e}_n,$$
where
$$\begin{align}
\boldsymbol{u} &= u \boldsymbol{e}_s,\\
\frac{\partial}{\partial s} &\equiv \boldsymbol{e}_s \cdot \nabla,\\
\frac{\partial\boldsymbol{e}_s}{\partial s} &= \frac{1}{R}\boldsymbol{e}_n,
\end{align}$$
and $R$ is the radius of curvature of the streamline.

Therefore, the momentum part of the Euler equations for a steady flow is found to have a simple form:
$$\begin{align}
\displaystyle u\frac{\partial u}{\partial s} &= -\frac{1}{\rho}\frac{\partial p}{\partial s},\\
\displaystyle                  {u^2 \over R} &= -\frac{1}{\rho}\frac{\partial p}{\partial n} &({\partial / \partial n}\equiv\boldsymbol{e}_n\cdot\nabla),\\
\displaystyle                              0 &= -\frac{1}{\rho}\frac{\partial p}{\partial b} &({\partial / \partial b}\equiv\boldsymbol{e}_b\cdot\nabla).
\end{align}$$

For barotropic flow $(\rho = \rho(p))$, Bernoulli's equation is derived from the first equation:
$$\frac{\partial}{\partial s}\left(\frac{u^2}{2} + \int\frac{\mathrm{d}p}{\rho}\right) = 0.$$

The second equation expresses that, in the case the streamline is curved, there should exist a pressure gradient normal to the streamline because the centripetal acceleration of the fluid parcel is only generated by the normal pressure gradient.

The third equation expresses that pressure is constant along the binormal axis.

==== Streamline curvature theorem ====
The "Streamline curvature theorem" states that the pressure at the upper surface of an airfoil is lower than the pressure far away and that the pressure at the lower surface is higher than the pressure far away; hence the pressure difference between the upper and lower surfaces of an airfoil generates a lift force.

Let $r$ be the distance from the center of curvature of the streamline, then the second equation is written as follows:
$$\frac{\partial p}{\partial r} = \rho \frac{u^2}{r}~(>0),$$

where ${\partial / \partial r} = -{\partial /\partial n}.$

This equation states:

In a steady flow of an inviscid fluid without external forces, the center of curvature of the streamline lies in the direction of decreasing radial pressure.

Although this relationship between the pressure field and flow curvature is very useful, it doesn't have a name in the English-language scientific literature. Japanese fluid-dynamicists call the relationship the "Streamline curvature theorem".

This "theorem" explains clearly why there are such low pressures in the centre of vortices, which consist of concentric circles of streamlines. This also is a way to intuitively explain why airfoils generate lift forces.

== Exact solutions ==
All potential flow solutions are also solutions of the Euler equations, and in particular the incompressible Euler equations when the potential is harmonic.

A two-dimensional parallel shear-flow.

Solutions to the Euler equations with vorticity are:

- parallel shear flows – where the flow is unidirectional, and the flow velocity only varies in the cross-flow directions, e.g. in a Cartesian coordinate system $(x,y,z)$ the flow is for instance in the $x$-direction – with the only non-zero velocity component being $u_x(y,z)$ only dependent on $y$ and $z$ and not on $x.$
- Arnold–Beltrami–Childress flow – an exact solution of the incompressible Euler equations.
- Taylor–Green vortex – a spatially periodic array of counter-rotating vortices that is an exact solution to the two-dimensional incompressible Euler equations whether inviscid or viscous.
- Two solutions of the three-dimensional Euler equations with cylindrical symmetry have been presented by Gibbon, Moore and Stuart in 2003. These two solutions have infinite energy; they blow up everywhere in space in finite time.

== Relation to the Euler–Arnold equation ==
The Euler equations for fluid dynamics can be derived from the Euler–Arnold equation, a class of partial differential equations (PDEs) that describe the geodesic flow on infinite-dimensional Lie groups equipped with right-invariant metrics. In such manner, the Euler equations can be interpreted as a geodesic flow on the group of volume-preserving diffeomorphisms. Also, the Euler equations of rigid body dynamics can be derived from the same Euler–Arnold equation.

== See also ==
- Bernoulli's theorem
- Kelvin's circulation theorem
- Cauchy equations
- Froude number
- Madelung equations
- Navier–Stokes equations
- Burgers' equation
- Jeans equations
- Perfect fluid
- D'Alembert's paradox
- List of topics named after Leonhard Euler
