= Cauchy momentum equation =

The Cauchy momentum equation is a vector partial differential equation put forth by Augustin-Louis Cauchy that describes the non-relativistic momentum transport in any continuum.

== Main equation ==
In convective (or Lagrangian) form the Cauchy momentum equation is written as:
$$\frac{D \mathbf{u}}{D t} = \frac 1 \rho \nabla \cdot \boldsymbol{\sigma} + \mathbf{a}$$

where

- $\mathbf{u}$ is the flow velocity vector field, which depends on time and space, (unit: $\mathrm{m/s}$)
- $t$ is time, (unit: $\mathrm{s}$)
- $\frac{D \mathbf{u}}{D t}$ is the material derivative of $\mathbf{u}$, equal to $\partial_t\mathbf{u} + \mathbf{u}\cdot \nabla\mathbf{u}$, (unit: $\mathrm{m/s^2}$)
- $\rho$ is the density at a given point of the continuum (for which the continuity equation holds), (unit: $\mathrm{kg/m^3}$)
- $\boldsymbol{\sigma}$ is the stress tensor, (unit: $\mathrm{Pa=N/m^2 = kg {\cdot} m^{-1} {\cdot} s^{-2}}$)
- $$\mathbf{a}=\begin{bmatrix}f_x\\ f_y\\ f_z\end{bmatrix}$$
  is a vector containing all of the body accelerations (sometimes simply gravitational acceleration), (unit: $\mathrm{m/s^2}$)
- $$\nabla\cdot\boldsymbol{\sigma}= \begin{bmatrix}
\dfrac{\partial \sigma_{xx}}{\partial x} + \dfrac{\partial \sigma_{yx}}{\partial y} + \dfrac{\partial \sigma_{zx}}{\partial z} \\
\dfrac{\partial \sigma_{xy}}{\partial x} + \dfrac{\partial \sigma_{yy}}{\partial y} + \dfrac{\partial \sigma_{zy}}{\partial z} \\
\dfrac{\partial \sigma_{xz}}{\partial x} + \dfrac{\partial \sigma_{yz}}{\partial y} + \dfrac{\partial \sigma_{zz}}{\partial z} \\
\end{bmatrix}$$
  is the divergence of stress tensor. (unit: $\mathrm{Pa/m=kg {\cdot} m^{-2} {\cdot} s^{-2} }$)

Commonly used SI units are given in parentheses although the equations are general in nature and other units can be entered into them or units can be removed at all by nondimensionalization.

Note that only we use column vectors (in the Cartesian coordinate system) above for clarity, but the equation is written using physical components (which are neither covariants ("column") nor contravariants ("row") ). However, if we chose a non-orthogonal curvilinear coordinate system, then we should calculate and write equations in covariant ("row vectors") or contravariant ("column vectors") form.

After an appropriate change of variables, it can also be written in conservation form:

$$\frac {\partial  \mathbf j }{\partial t}+ \nabla \cdot \mathbf F  = \mathbf f$$

where j is the momentum density at a given space-time point, F is the flux associated to the momentum density, and f contains all of the body forces per unit volume.

== Differential derivation ==
Let us start with the generalized momentum conservation principle which can be written as follows: "The change in system momentum is proportional to the resulting force acting on this system". It is expressed by the formula:

$$\mathbf p(t+\Delta t) - \mathbf p(t) = \Delta t \bar{\mathbf F}$$

where $\mathbf p(t)$ is momentum at time t, and $\bar {\mathbf F}$ is force averaged over $\Delta t$. After dividing by $\Delta t$ and passing to the limit $\Delta t \to 0$ we get (derivative):

$$\frac{d\mathbf p}{dt} = \mathbf F$$

Let us analyse each side of the equation above.

=== Right side ===
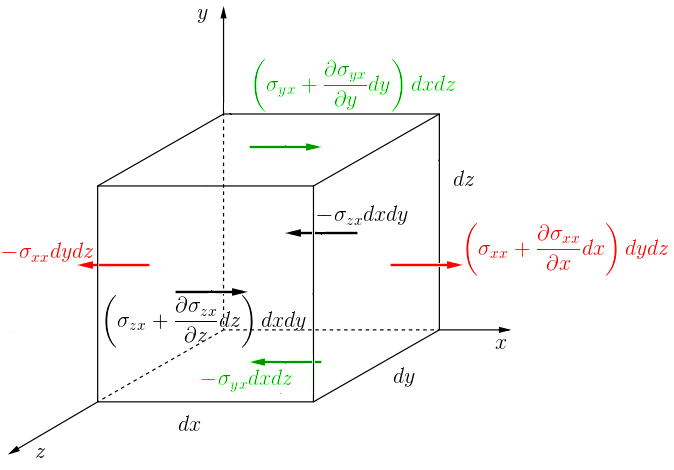
The x-component of the forces acting on walls of a cubic fluid element (green for top-bottom walls; red for left-right; black for front-back).

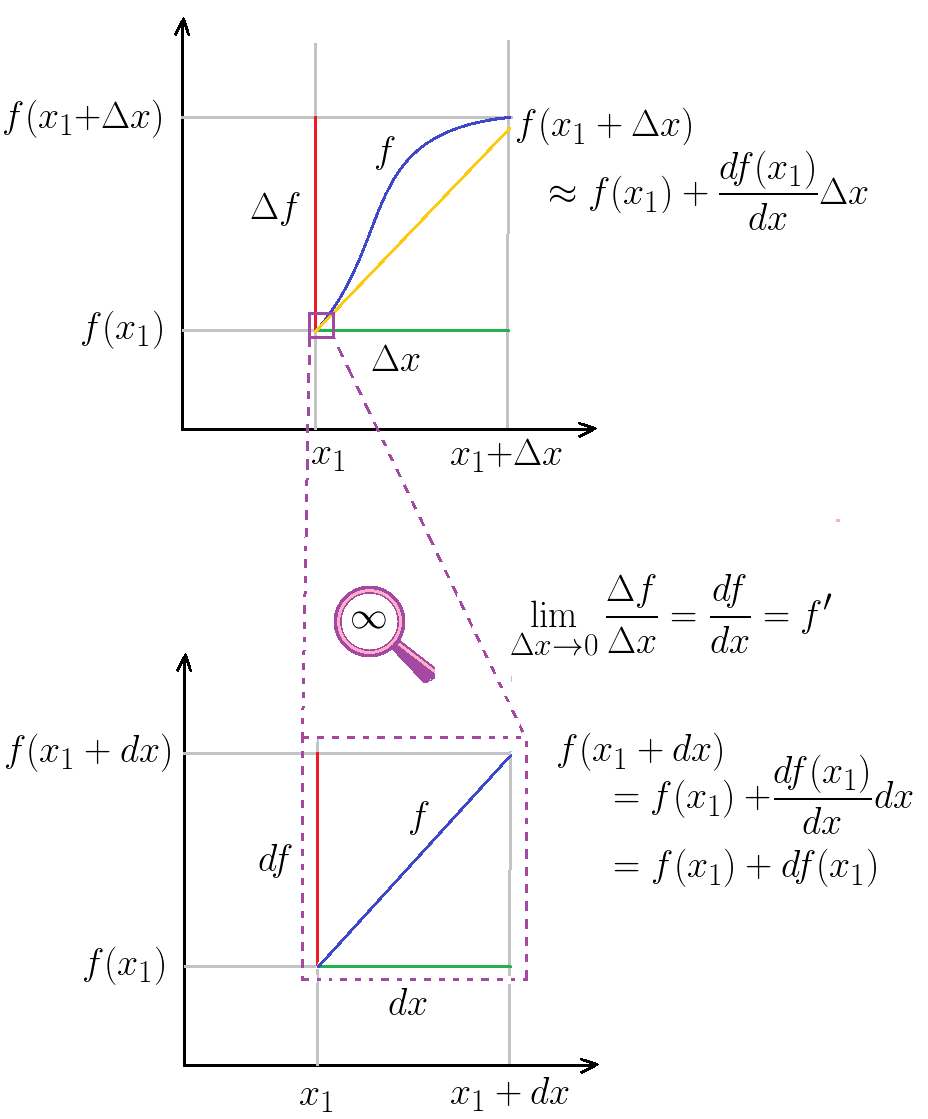
In the top graph we see approximation of function $f(x)$ (blue line) using a finite difference (yellow line). In the bottom graph we see "infinitely many times enlarged neighborhood of point $x_1$" (purple square from the upper graph). In the bottom graph, the yellow line is completely covered by the blue one, thus not visible. In the bottom figure, two equivalent derivative forms have been used: $f'(x_1)=\frac{df(x_1)}{dx_1}$], and the designation $\Delta f = f(x_1+\Delta x) - f(x_1)$ was used.

We split the forces into body forces $\mathbf F_m$ and surface forces $\mathbf F_p$

$$\mathbf F=\mathbf F_p + \mathbf F_m$$

Surface forces act on walls of the cubic fluid element. For each wall, the X component of these forces was marked in the figure with a cubic element (in the form of a product of stress and surface area e.g. $-\sigma_{xx} \, dy \, dz$ with unit $\mathrm{Pa{\cdot} m{\cdot} m = \frac{N}{m^2} {\cdot} m^2 = N}$).

Explanation of the value of forces (approximations and minus signs) acting on the cube walls.

It requires some explanation why stress applied to the walls covering the coordinate axes takes a minus sign (e.g. for the left wall we have $-\sigma_{xx}$). For simplicity, let us focus on the left wall with tension $-\sigma_{xx}$. The minus sign is due to the fact that a vector normal to this wall $\mathbf n =[-1,0,0]=-\mathbf e_x$ is a negative unit vector. Then, we calculated the stress vector by definition $\mathbf s=\mathbf n\cdot \boldsymbol\sigma=[-\sigma_{xx},-\sigma_{xy},-\sigma_{xz}]$, thus the X component of this vector is $s_x=-\sigma_{xx}$ (we use similar reasoning for stresses acting on the bottom and back walls, i.e.: $-\sigma_{yx},-\sigma_{zx}$).

The second element requiring explanation is the approximation of the values of stress acting on the walls opposite the walls covering the axes. Let us focus on the right wall where the stress is an approximation of stress $\sigma_{xx}$ from the left wall at points with coordinates $x+dx$ and it is equal to $\sigma_{xx}+\frac{\partial\sigma_{xx}}{\partial x}dx$. This approximation suffices since, as $dx$ goes to zero, $\frac{\sigma_{xx}(x+dx) -( \sigma_{xx}(x) + dx\frac{\partial\sigma_{xx}(x)}{\partial x})}{dx} = \frac{\sigma_{xx}(x+dx) - \sigma_{xx}(x)}{dx} - \frac{\partial\sigma_{xx}(x)}{\partial x}$ goes to zero as well, by definition of partial derivative.

A more intuitive representation of the value of approximation $\sigma_{xx}$ in point $x+dx$ has been shown in the figure below the cube. We proceed with similar reasoning for stress approximations $\sigma_{yx},\sigma_{zx}$.

Adding forces (their x-components) acting on each of the cube walls, we get:

$$F_p^x =
\left(\sigma_{xx}+\frac{\partial\sigma_{xx}}{\partial x}dx\right)dy\,dz
-\sigma_{xx}dy\,dz
+\left(\sigma_{yx}+\frac{\partial\sigma_{yx}}{\partial y}dy\right)dx\,dz
-\sigma_{yx}dx\,dz
+\left(\sigma_{zx}+\frac{\partial\sigma_{zx}}{\partial z}dz\right)dx\,dy
-\sigma_{zx}dx\,dy$$

After ordering $F_p^x$ and performing similar reasoning for components $F_p^y, F_p^z$ (they have not been shown in the figure, but these would be vectors parallel to the Y and Z axes, respectively) we get:

$$\begin{align}
F_p^x &= \frac{\partial\sigma_{xx}}{\partial x}\,dx\,dy\,dz
+ \frac{\partial\sigma_{yx}}{\partial y}\,dy\,dx\,dz
+ \frac{\partial\sigma_{zx}}{\partial z}\,dz\,dx\,dy
\\[6pt]
F_p^y &= \frac{\partial\sigma_{xy}}{\partial x}\,dx\,dy\,dz
+\frac{\partial\sigma_{yy}}{\partial y}\,dy\,dx\,dz
+\frac{\partial\sigma_{zy}}{\partial z}\,dz\,dx\,dy
\\[6pt]
F_p^z &= \frac{\partial\sigma_{xz}}{\partial x}\,dx\,dy\,dz
+\frac{\partial\sigma_{yz}}{\partial y}\,dy\,dx\,dz
+\frac{\partial\sigma_{zz}}{\partial z}\,dz\,dx\,dy
\vphantom{\begin{matrix} \\ \\ \end{matrix}}
\end{align}$$

We can then write it in the symbolic operational form:

$$\mathbf F_p=(\nabla\cdot\boldsymbol\sigma) \,dx\,dy\,dz$$

There are mass forces acting on the inside of the control volume. We can write them using the body force field $\mathbf{f}$ (e.g. gravitational acceleration):
$$\mathbf F_m = \rho \mathbf a \,dx\,dy\,dz$$

=== Left side ===
Let us calculate momentum of the cube:
$$\mathbf p = \mathbf u m = \mathbf u \rho \, dx \, dy \, dz$$

Because we assume that tested mass (cube) $m=\rho \,dx\,dy\,dz$ is constant in time, so
$$\frac{d\mathbf p}{dt}=\frac{d\mathbf u}{dt} \rho \, dx \, dy \, dz$$

=== Left and right side comparison ===
We have

$$\frac{d\mathbf p}{dt}=\mathbf F$$

then

$$\frac{d\mathbf p}{dt}=\mathbf F_p + \mathbf F_m$$
then
$$\frac{d\mathbf u}{dt}\rho \, dx \, dy \, dz = (\nabla\cdot\boldsymbol\sigma)dx \, dy \, dz + \mathbf f \,dx \, dy \, dz$$

Divide both sides by $\rho \,dx\,dy\,dz$, and because $\frac{d\mathbf u}{dt} = \frac{D\mathbf u}{Dt}$ we get:
$$\frac{D\mathbf u}{Dt} = \frac{1}{\rho}\nabla\cdot\boldsymbol\sigma + \mathbf a$$

which finishes the derivation.

== Integral derivation ==
Applying Newton's second law (ith component) to a control volume in the continuum being modeled gives:

$$m a_i = F_i$$

Then, based on the Reynolds transport theorem and using material derivative notation, one can write

$$\begin{align}
\int_{\Omega} \rho \frac{D u_i}{D t} \, dV &= \int_{\Omega} \nabla_j\sigma_i^j \, dV + \int_{\Omega} f_i \, dV \\
\int_{\Omega} \left(\rho \frac{D u_i}{D t} - \nabla_j\sigma_i^j - f_i \right)\, dV &= 0 \\
\rho \frac{D u_i}{D t}- \nabla_j\sigma_i^j - f_i &= 0 \\
\frac{D u_i}{D t}- \frac {\nabla_j\sigma_i^j}{\rho} - \frac{f_i}{\rho} &= 0
\end{align}$$

where Ω represents the control volume. Since this equation must hold for any control volume, it must be true that the integrand is zero, from this the Cauchy momentum equation follows. The main step (not done above) in deriving this equation is establishing that the derivative of the stress tensor is one of the forces that constitutes F_{i}.

== Conservation form ==
The Cauchy momentum equation can also be put in the following form:

Cauchy momentum equation (conservation form)

$\frac {\partial \mathbf j}{\partial t}+ \nabla \cdot \mathbf F = \mathbf f$

simply by defining:

$$\begin{align}
{\mathbf j}&= \rho \mathbf u \\
{\mathbf F}&=\rho \mathbf u \otimes \mathbf u - \boldsymbol \sigma \\
{\mathbf f}&= \rho \mathbf a
\end{align}$$

where j is the momentum density at the point considered in the continuum (for which the continuity equation holds), F is the flux associated to the momentum density, and f contains all of the body forces per unit volume. u ⊗ u is the outer product of the velocity with itself.

Here j and f have same number of dimensions N as the flow speed and the body acceleration, while F, being a tensor, has N^{2}. (Note: In 3D for example, with respect to some coordinate system, the vector j has 3 components, while the tensors σ and F have 9 (3×3), so the explicit forms written as matrices would be: $$\begin{align} {\mathbf j} &= \begin{pmatrix}  \rho u_1 \\ \rho u_2  \\ \rho u_3 \end{pmatrix} \\ {\mathbf f} &= \begin{pmatrix}  \rho g_1 \\ \rho g_2  \\ \rho g_3 \end{pmatrix} \\ {\mathbf F} &= \begin{pmatrix} \rho u_1^2   + \sigma_{11} & \rho u_1 u_2 + \sigma_{12} & \rho u_1 u_3 + \sigma_{13} \\  \rho u_2 u_1 + \sigma_{12} & \rho u_2^2   + \sigma_{22} & \rho u_2 u_3 + \sigma_{23} \\  \rho u_3 u_1 + \sigma_{13} & \rho u_3 u_2 + \sigma_{23} & \rho u_3^2   + \sigma_{33} \end{pmatrix}\end{align}$$ Note, however, that if symmetrical, F will only contain 6 degrees of freedom. And F's symmetry is equivalent to σ's symmetry (which will be present for the most common Cauchy stress tensors), since outer products of vectors with themselves are always symmetrical.)

In the Eulerian forms it is apparent that the assumption of no deviatoric stress brings Cauchy equations to the Euler equations.

== Convective acceleration ==
An example of convective acceleration. The flow is steady (time-independent), but the fluid decelerates as it moves down the diverging duct (assuming incompressible or subsonic compressible flow).

A significant feature of the Navier–Stokes equations is the presence of convective acceleration: the effect of time-independent acceleration of a flow with respect to space. While individual continuum particles indeed experience time dependent acceleration, the convective acceleration of the flow field is a spatial effect, one example being fluid speeding up in a nozzle.

Regardless of what kind of continuum is being dealt with, convective acceleration is a nonlinear effect. Convective acceleration is present in most flows (exceptions include one-dimensional incompressible flow), but its dynamic effect is disregarded in creeping flow (also called Stokes flow). Convective acceleration is represented by the nonlinear quantity u ⋅ ∇u, which may be interpreted either as (u ⋅ ∇)u or as u ⋅ (∇u), with ∇u the tensor derivative of the velocity vector u. Both interpretations give the same result.

=== Advection operator vs tensor derivative ===
The convective acceleration (u ⋅ ∇)u can be thought of as the advection operator u ⋅ ∇ acting on the velocity field u. This contrasts with the expression in terms of tensor derivative ∇u, which is the component-wise derivative of the velocity vector defined by [∇u]_{mi} = ∂_{m} v_{i}, so that
$$\left[\mathbf{u}\cdot\left(\nabla \mathbf{u}\right)\right]_i=\sum_m v_m \partial_m v_i=\left[(\mathbf{u}\cdot\nabla)\mathbf{u}\right]_i\,.$$

=== Lamb form ===
The vector calculus identity of the cross product of a curl holds:

$$\mathbf{v} \times \left( \nabla \times \mathbf{a} \right) = \nabla_a \left( \mathbf{v} \cdot \mathbf{a} \right) - \mathbf{v} \cdot \nabla \mathbf{a}$$

where the Feynman subscript notation ∇_{a} is used, which means the subscripted gradient operates only on the factor a.

Lamb in his famous classical book Hydrodynamics (1895), used this identity to change the convective term of the flow velocity in rotational form, i.e. without a tensor derivative:

$$\mathbf{u} \cdot \nabla \mathbf{u} = \nabla \left( \frac{\|\mathbf{u}\|^2}{2} \right) + \left( \nabla \times \mathbf{u} \right) \times \mathbf{u}$$

where the vector $\mathbf l = \mathbf{u} \times \left( \nabla \times \mathbf{u} \right)$ is called the Lamb vector. The Cauchy momentum equation becomes:

$$\frac{\partial \mathbf{u}}{\partial t} + \frac{1}{2} \nabla \left(u^2\right) + (\nabla \times \mathbf u) \times \mathbf u = \frac 1 \rho \nabla \cdot \boldsymbol \sigma + \mathbf{a}$$

Using the identity:

$$\nabla \cdot \left( \frac {\boldsymbol \sigma}{\rho} \right) = \frac 1 \rho \nabla \cdot \boldsymbol \sigma - \frac{1}{\rho^2} \boldsymbol \sigma \cdot \nabla \rho$$

the Cauchy equation becomes:

$$\nabla \cdot \left(\frac{1}{2} u^2 - \frac {\boldsymbol \sigma} \rho \right) - \mathbf a = \frac{1}{\rho^2} \boldsymbol \sigma \cdot \nabla \rho + \mathbf u \times (\nabla \times \mathbf u) - \frac{\partial \mathbf u}{\partial t}$$

In fact, in case of an external conservative field, by defining its potential φ:

$$\nabla \cdot \left( \frac{1}{2} u^2 + \phi - \frac {\boldsymbol \sigma} \rho \right) = \frac{1}{\rho^2} \boldsymbol \sigma \cdot \nabla \rho + \mathbf u \times (\nabla \times \mathbf u) - \frac{\partial \mathbf u}{\partial t}$$

In case of a steady flow the time derivative of the flow velocity disappears, so the momentum equation becomes:

$$\nabla \cdot \left( \frac{1}{2} u^2 + \phi - \frac {\boldsymbol \sigma} \rho \right) = \frac{1}{\rho^2} \boldsymbol \sigma \cdot \nabla \rho  + \mathbf u \times (\nabla \times \mathbf u)$$

And by projecting the momentum equation on the flow direction, i.e. along a streamline, the cross product disappears due to a vector calculus identity of the triple scalar product:

$$\mathbf u \cdot \nabla \cdot \left( \frac{1}{2} u^2 + \phi - \frac {\boldsymbol \sigma} \rho \right) = \frac{1}{\rho^2} \mathbf u \cdot (\boldsymbol \sigma \cdot \nabla \rho)$$

If the stress tensor is isotropic, then only the pressure enters: $\boldsymbol \sigma = -p \mathbf I$ (where I is the identity tensor), and the Euler momentum equation in the steady incompressible case becomes:

$$\mathbf u \cdot \nabla \left( \frac{1}{2} u^2 + \phi + \frac p \rho \right) + \frac{p}{\rho^2} \mathbf u \cdot \nabla \rho = 0$$

In the steady incompressible case the mass equation is simply:

$$\mathbf u \cdot \nabla \rho = 0\,,$$

that is, the mass conservation for a steady incompressible flow states that the density along a streamline is constant. This leads to a considerable simplification of the Euler momentum equation:

$$\mathbf u \cdot \nabla \left( \frac{1}{2} u^2 + \phi + \frac p \rho \right) = 0$$

The convenience of defining the total head for an inviscid liquid flow is now apparent:

$$b_l \equiv \frac{1}{2} u^2 + \phi + \frac p \rho\,,$$

in fact, the above equation can be simply written as:

$$\mathbf u \cdot \nabla b_l = 0$$

That is, the momentum balance for a steady inviscid and incompressible flow in an external conservative field states that the total head along a streamline is constant.

=== Irrotational flows ===
The Lamb form is also useful in irrotational flow, where the curl of the velocity (called vorticity) ω = ∇ × u is equal to zero. In that case, the convection term in $D\mathbf{u}/Dt$ reduces to

$$\mathbf{u} \cdot \nabla \mathbf{u} = \nabla \left( \frac{\|\mathbf{u}\|^2}{2} \right).$$

== Stresses ==
The effect of stress in the continuum flow is represented by the ∇p and ∇ ⋅ τ terms; these are gradients of surface forces, analogous to stresses in a solid. Here ∇p is the pressure gradient and arises from the isotropic part of the Cauchy stress tensor. This part is given by the normal stresses that occur in almost all situations. The anisotropic part of the stress tensor gives rise to ∇ ⋅ τ, which usually describes viscous forces; for incompressible flow, this is only a shear effect. Thus, τ is the deviatoric stress tensor, and the stress tensor is equal to:

$$\boldsymbol \sigma = - p \mathbf I + \boldsymbol \tau$$

where I is the identity matrix in the space considered and τ the shear tensor.

All non-relativistic momentum conservation equations, such as the Navier–Stokes equation, can be derived by beginning with the Cauchy momentum equation and specifying the stress tensor through a constitutive relation. By expressing the shear tensor in terms of viscosity and fluid velocity, and assuming constant density and viscosity, the Cauchy momentum equation will lead to the Navier–Stokes equations. By assuming inviscid flow, the Navier–Stokes equations can further simplify to the Euler equations.

The divergence of the stress tensor can be written as

$$\nabla \cdot \boldsymbol{\sigma} = -\nabla p + \nabla \cdot \boldsymbol{\tau}.$$

The effect of the pressure gradient on the flow is to accelerate the flow in the direction from high pressure to low pressure.

As written in the Cauchy momentum equation, the stress terms p and τ are yet unknown, so this equation alone cannot be used to solve problems. Besides the equations of motion—Newton's second law—a force model is needed relating the stresses to the flow motion. For this reason, assumptions based on natural observations are often applied to specify the stresses in terms of the other flow variables, such as velocity and density.

== External forces ==
The vector field a represents body forces per unit mass. Typically, these consist of only gravity acceleration, but may include others, such as electromagnetic forces. In non-inertial coordinate frames, other "inertial accelerations" associated with rotating coordinates may arise.

Often, these forces may be represented as the gradient of some scalar quantity χ, with a = ∇χ in which case they are called conservative forces. Gravity in the z direction, for example, is the gradient of −ρgz. Because pressure from such gravitation arises only as a gradient, we may include it in the pressure term as a body force h = p − χ. The pressure and force terms on the right-hand side of the Navier–Stokes equation become

$$-\nabla p + \mathbf{a} = -\nabla p + \nabla \chi = -\nabla \left( p - \chi \right) = -\nabla h.$$

It is also possible to include external influences into the stress term $\boldsymbol{\sigma}$ rather than the body force term. This may even include antisymmetric stresses (inputs of angular momentum), in contrast to the usually symmetrical internal contributions to the stress tensor.

== Nondimensionalisation ==
In order to make the equations dimensionless, a characteristic length r_{0} and a characteristic velocity u_{0} need to be defined. These should be chosen such that the dimensionless variables are all of order one. The following dimensionless variables are thus obtained:

$$\begin{align}
\rho^* &\equiv \frac \rho {\rho_0} & u^* &\equiv \frac u {u_0} & r^* &\equiv \frac r {r_0} & t^*&\equiv \frac {u_0}{r_0} t \\[6pt]
\nabla^* &\equiv r_0 \nabla & \mathbf a^* &\equiv \frac {\mathbf a} {a_0} & p^* &\equiv \frac p {p_0} & \boldsymbol \tau^* &\equiv \frac {\boldsymbol \tau} {\tau_0}
\end{align}$$

Substitution of these inverted relations in the Euler momentum equations yields:

$$\frac {\rho_0 u_0^2}{r_0}\frac{\partial \rho^* \mathbf u^*}{\partial t^*}+ \frac {\nabla^*}{r_0} \cdot \left( \rho_0 u_0^2 \rho^* \mathbf u^* \otimes \mathbf u^* + p_0 p^* \right)= - \frac {\tau_0}{r_0} \nabla^* \cdot \boldsymbol \tau^* + a_0 \mathbf a^*$$

and by dividing for the first coefficient:

$$\frac{\partial \mathbf \rho^* u^*}{\partial t^*}+  \nabla^* \cdot \left(\rho^* \mathbf u^* \otimes  \mathbf u^* + \frac {p_0}{\rho_0 u_0^2} p^* \right)= - \frac {\tau_0}{\rho_0 u_0^2} \nabla^* \cdot \boldsymbol \tau^* + \frac { a_0 r_0}{u_0^2} \mathbf a^*$$

Now defining the Froude number:

$$\mathrm{Fr}=\frac{u_0^2}{a_0 r_0},$$

the Euler number:

$$\mathrm{Eu}=\frac{p_0}{\rho_0 u_0^2},$$

and the coefficient of skin-friction or the one usually referred as 'drag coefficient' in the field of aerodynamics:

$$C_\mathrm{f}=\frac{2 \tau_0}{\rho_0 u_0^2},$$

by passing respectively to the conservative variables, i.e. the momentum density and the force density:

$$\begin{align}
\mathbf j &= \rho \mathbf u \\
\mathbf f &= \rho \mathbf a
\end{align}$$

the equations are finally expressed (now omitting the indexes):

Cauchy momentum equation (nondimensional conservative form)

$\frac{\partial \mathbf j }{\partial t}+ \nabla \cdot \left(\frac 1 \rho \mathbf j \otimes \mathbf j + \mathrm{Eu} \, p \right) = - \frac {C_\mathrm{f}} 2 \nabla \cdot \boldsymbol \tau + \frac 1 {\mathrm{Fr}} \mathbf f$

Cauchy equations in the Froude limit Fr → ∞ (corresponding to negligible external field) are named free Cauchy equations:

Free Cauchy momentum equation (nondimensional conservative form)

$\frac{\partial \mathbf j }{\partial t}+ \nabla \cdot \left(\frac 1 \rho \mathbf j \otimes \mathbf j + \mathrm{Eu} \, p \right) = - \frac {C_\mathrm{f}} 2 \nabla \cdot \boldsymbol \tau$

and can be eventually conservation equations. The limit of high Froude numbers (low external field) is thus notable for such equations and is studied with perturbation theory.

Finally in convective form the equations are:

Cauchy momentum equation (nondimensional convective form)

$\frac{D \mathbf u }{ D t} + \mathrm{Eu} \, \frac 1 \rho \nabla \cdot \boldsymbol \sigma = \frac 1 {\mathrm{Fr}} \mathbf a$

== 3D explicit convective forms ==
=== Cartesian 3D coordinates ===
For asymmetric stress tensors, equations in general take the following forms:

$$\begin{align}
x&: & \frac{\partial u_x}{\partial t} + u_x \frac{\partial u_x}{\partial x} + u_y \frac{\partial u_x}{\partial y} + u_z \frac{\partial u_x}{\partial z} &= \frac 1 \rho \left( \frac{\partial \sigma_{xx}}{\partial x} + \frac{\partial \sigma_{yx}}{\partial y} + \frac{\partial \sigma_{zx}}{\partial z} \right) + a_x \\[8pt]
y&: & \frac{\partial u_y}{\partial t} + u_x \frac{\partial u_y}{\partial x} + u_y \frac{\partial u_y}{\partial y} + u_z \frac{\partial u_y}{\partial z} &= \frac 1 \rho \left( \frac{\partial \sigma_{xy}}{\partial x} + \frac{\partial \sigma_{yy}}{\partial y} + \frac{\partial \sigma_{zy}}{\partial z} \right) + a_y \\[8pt]
z&: & \frac{\partial u_z}{\partial t} + u_x \frac{\partial u_z}{\partial x} + u_y \frac{\partial u_z}{\partial y} + u_z \frac{\partial u_z}{\partial z} &= \frac 1 \rho \left( \frac{\partial \sigma_{xz}}{\partial x} + \frac{\partial \sigma_{yz}}{\partial y} + \frac{\partial \sigma_{zz}}{\partial z} \right) + a_z
\end{align}$$

=== Cylindrical 3D coordinates ===
Below, we write the main equation in pressure-tau form assuming that the stress tensor is symmetrical ($\sigma_{ij}=\sigma_{ji} \Longrightarrow \tau_{ij}=\tau_{ji}$):

$$\begin{align}
r&: &\frac{\partial u_r}{\partial t} + u_r \frac{\partial u_r}{\partial r} + \frac{u_\phi}{r} \frac{\partial u_r}{\partial\phi} + u_z \frac{\partial u_r}{\partial z} - \frac{u_\phi^2}{r}
&= -\frac{1}{\rho} \frac{\partial P}{\partial r} + \frac{1}{r\rho}\frac{\partial\left(r\tau_{rr}\right)}{\partial r} + \frac{1}{r\rho} \frac{\partial\tau_{\phi r}}{\partial\phi} + \frac{1}{\rho} \frac{\partial\tau_{zr}}{\partial z} - \frac{\tau_{\phi\phi}}{r\rho} + a_r
\\[8pt]
\phi&: &\frac{\partial u_\phi}{\partial t} + u_r \frac{\partial u_\phi}{\partial r} + \frac{u_\phi}{r} \frac{\partial u_\phi}{\partial\phi} + u_z \frac{\partial u_\phi}{\partial z} + \frac{u_r u_\phi}{r}
&= -\frac{1}{r\rho} \frac{\partial P}{\partial\phi} + \frac{1}{r\rho}\frac{\partial\tau_{\phi \phi}}{\partial\phi} + \frac{1}{r^2 \rho} \frac{\partial\left(r^2 \tau_{r\phi}\right)}{\partial r} + \frac{1}{\rho} \frac{\partial\tau_{z\phi}}{\partial z} + a_\phi
\\[8pt]
z&: &\frac{\partial u_z}{\partial t} + u_r \frac{\partial u_z}{\partial r} + \frac{u_\phi}{r} \frac{\partial u_z}{\partial\phi} + u_z \frac{\partial u_z}{\partial z}
&= -\frac{1}{\rho} \frac{\partial P}{\partial z} + \frac{1}{\rho} \frac{\partial\tau_{zz}}{\partial z} + \frac{1}{r\rho}\frac{\partial\tau_{\phi z}}{\partial\phi} + \frac{1}{r\rho}\frac{\partial\left(r\tau_{rz}\right)}{\partial r} + a_z
\end{align}$$

== See also ==
- Euler equations (fluid dynamics)
- Navier–Stokes equations
- Burnett equations
- Chapman–Enskog expansion
