= Ground force =

Ground force may refer to:

- Ground Force, a British garden makeover television series
- Ground forces, a designation some countries give to their armies
- Ground reaction force (GRF), the force exerted by the ground on a body in contact with it
