= Non-contact force =

Force which acts on an object without coming physically in contact with it

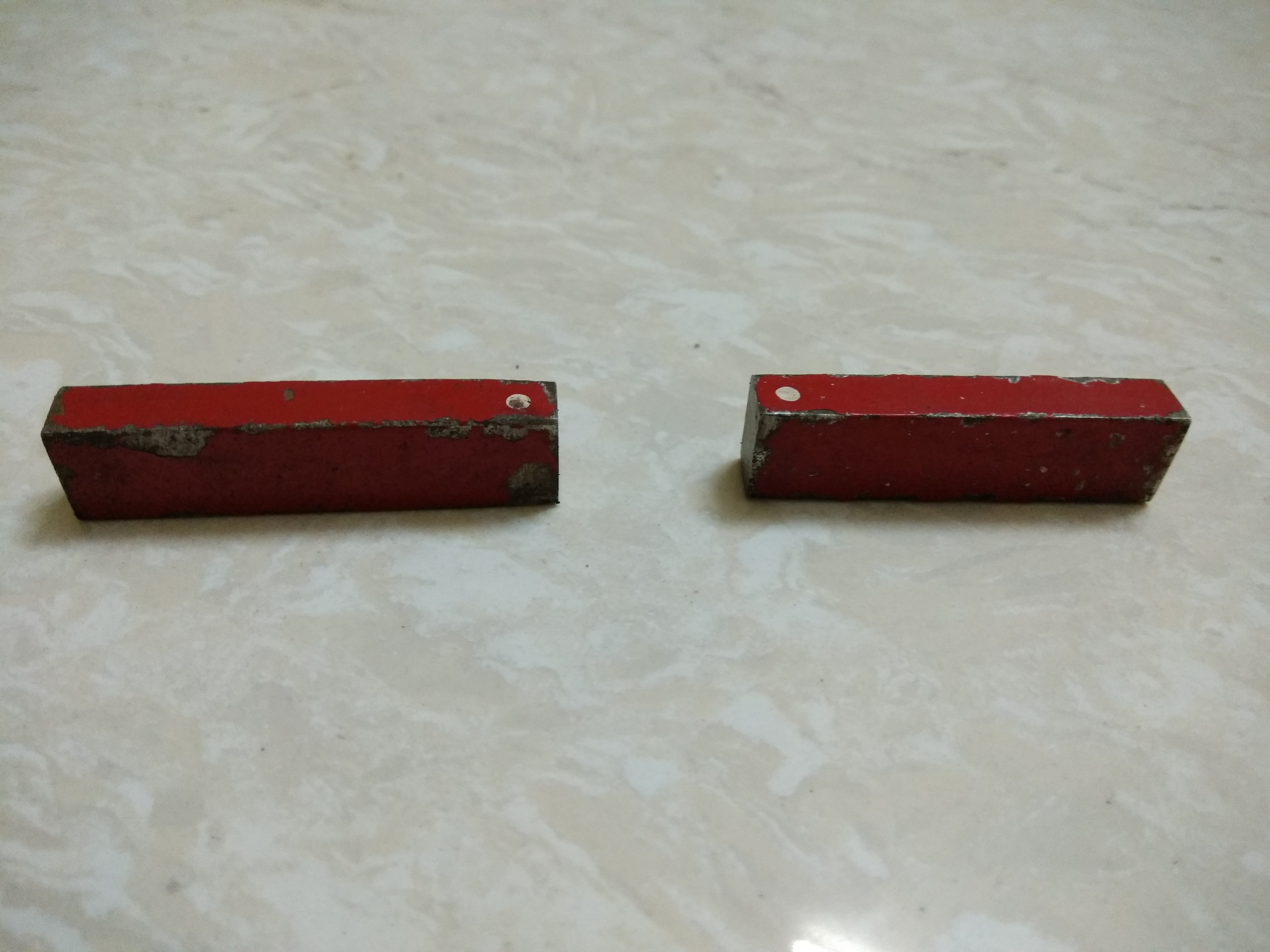
Two magnets of the same polarity will push each other away with a non-contact force

A non-contact force is a force which acts on an object without coming physically in contact with it. The most familiar non-contact force is gravity, which confers weight. In contrast, a contact force is a force which acts on an object coming physically in contact with it.

All four known fundamental interactions are non-contact forces:

- Gravity, the force of attraction that exists among all bodies that have mass. The force exerted on each body by the other through weight is proportional to the mass of the first body times the mass of the second body divided by the square of the distance between them.
- Electromagnetism is the force that causes the interaction between electrically charged particles; the areas in which this happens are called electromagnetic fields. Examples of this force include: electricity, magnetism, radio waves, microwaves, infrared, visible light, X-rays and gamma rays. Electromagnetism mediates all chemical, biological, electrical and electronic processes.
- Strong nuclear force: Unlike gravity and electromagnetism, the strong nuclear force is a short distance force that takes place between fundamental particles within a nucleus. It is charge independent and acts equally between a proton and a proton, a neutron and a neutron, and a proton and a neutron. The strong nuclear force is the strongest force in nature; however, its range is small (acting only over distances of the order of 10^{−15} m). The strong nuclear force mediates both nuclear fission and fusion reactions.
- Weak nuclear force: The weak nuclear force mediates the β decay of a neutron, in which the neutron decays into a proton and in the process emits a β particle and an uncharged particle called a neutrino. As a result of mediating the β decay process, the weak nuclear force plays a key role in supernovas. Both the strong and weak forces form an important part of quantum mechanics.

== See also ==
- Tension
- Body force
- Surface force
- Action at a distance
