= Crocco =

Crocco is an Italian surname. Notable people with the surname include:

- Carmine Crocco (1830–1905), also known as Donatello and Italian guerrilla head
- Claudio Crocco (born 1958), Argentine footballer
- Gaetano Arturo Crocco (1877–1968), Italian mathematician and space scientist
- Mario Crocco (born 1926), Italo-Argentinian neurobiologist
- Matt Crocco (born 1971), American musician, writer, and producer

== See also ==
- Crocco (crater), a lunar crater so named to honor Gaetano Crocco
- 10606 Crocco, asteroid of the Solar System so named to honor Gaetano Crocco
- Crocco Grand Tour, a spaceship's interplanetary trajectory
- Crocco's theorem, a fluid dynamics theorem by Italian scientist Luigi Crocco
- Elevator Magenta-Crocco, public elevator in the Castelletto quarter of Genoa, Italy
