= Computational magnetohydrodynamics =

Branch of magnetohydrodynamics

Computational magnetohydrodynamics (CMHD) is a rapidly developing branch of magnetohydrodynamics that uses numerical methods and algorithms to solve and analyze problems that involve electrically conducting fluids. Most of the methods used in CMHD are borrowed from the well established techniques employed in Computational fluid dynamics. The complexity mainly arises due to the presence of a magnetic field and its coupling with the fluid. One of the important issues is to numerically maintain the $\nabla \cdot {\mathbf B} = 0$ (conservation of magnetic flux) condition, from Maxwell's equations, to avoid the presence of unrealistic effects, namely magnetic monopoles, in the solutions.

== Open-source MHD software ==
- Pencil Code
  Compressible resistive MHD, intrinsically divergence free, embedded particles module, finite-difference explicit scheme, high-order derivatives, Fortran95 and C, parallelized up to hundreds of thousands cores. Source code is available.
- RAMSES
  RAMSES is an open source program to model astrophysical systems, featuring self-gravitating, magnetised, compressible, radiative fluid flows. It is based on the Adaptive Mesh Refinement (AMR) technique on a fully threaded graded octree. RAMSES is written in Fortran 90 and is making intensive use of the Message Passing Interface (MPI) library. Source code is available.
- RamsesGPU
  RamsesGPU is an MHD program written in C++, based on the original RAMSES but only for regular grid (no AMR). The code has been designed to run on large clusters of GPU (NVIDIA graphics processors), so parallelization relies on MPI for distributed memory processing, as well as the programing language CUDA for efficient usage of GPU resources. Static Gravity Fields are supported. Different finite volume methods are implemented. Source code is available.
- Athena
  Athena is a grid-based program for astrophysical magnetohydrodynamics (MHD). It was developed primarily for studies of the interstellar medium, star formation, and accretion flows. Source code is available.
- EOF-Library
  EOF-Library is a software that couples Elmer FEM and OpenFOAM simulation packages. It enables efficient internal field interpolation and communication between the finite element and the finite volume frameworks. Potential applications are MHD, convective cooling of electrical devices, industrial plasma physics and microwave heating of liquids.

== Closed-source MHD software ==
- USim
- MACH2
- STAR-CCM+

== See also ==
- Magnetohydrodynamic turbulence
- Magnetic flow meter
- Plasma modeling
