= Ground reaction force =

Force exerted by the ground on a body in contact with it

In physics, and in particular in biomechanics, the ground reaction force (GRF) is the force exerted by the ground on a body in contact with it. For example, a person standing motionless on the ground exerts a contact force on it (equal to the person's weight) and at the same time an equal and opposite ground reaction force is exerted by the ground on the person.

In the above example, the ground reaction force coincides with the notion of a normal force. However, in a more general case, the GRF will also have a component parallel to the ground, for example when the person is walking – a motion that requires the exchange of horizontal (frictional) forces with the ground.

The use of the word reaction derives from Newton's third law, which essentially states that if a force, called action, acts upon a body, then an equal and opposite force, called reaction, must act upon another body. The force exerted by the ground is conventionally referred to as the reaction, although, since the distinction between action and reaction is completely arbitrary, the expression ground action would be, in principle, equally acceptable.

The component of the GRF parallel to the surface is the frictional force. When slippage occurs the ratio of the magnitude of the frictional force to the normal force yields the coefficient of static friction.

GRF is often observed to evaluate force production in various groups within the community. One of these groups studied often are athletes to help evaluate a subject's ability to exert force and power. This can help create baseline parameters when creating strength and conditioning regimens from a rehabilitation and coaching standpoint. Plyometric jumps such as a drop-jump is an activity often used to build greater power and force which can lead to overall better ability on the playing field. When landing from a safe height in a bilateral comparisons on GRF in relation to landing with the dominant foot first followed by the non-dominant limb, literature has shown there were no significances in bilateral components with landing with the dominant foot first faster than the non-dominant foot on the GRF of the drop-jump or landing on vertical GRF output.
