= Contact force =

Force between two objects that are in physical contact

Block on a ramp and corresponding free body diagram of the block showing the contact force from the ramp onto the bottom of the block and separated into two components, a normal force N and a friction force f, along with the body force of gravity mg acting at the center of mass.

A contact force is any force that occurs because of two objects making contact with each other. Contact forces are very common and are responsible for most visible interactions between macroscopic collections of matter. Pushing a car or kicking a ball are everyday examples where contact forces are at work. In the first case the force is continuously applied to the car by a person, while in the second case the force is delivered in a short impulse.

Contact forces are often decomposed into orthogonal components, one perpendicular to the surface(s) in contact called the normal force, and one parallel to the surface(s) in contact, called the friction force.

Not all forces are contact forces; for example, the weight of an object is the force between the object and the Earth, even though the two do not need to make contact. Gravitational forces, electrical forces and magnetic forces are body forces and can exist without contact occurring.

== Origin ==
The microscopic origin of contact forces is diverse. Normal force is directly a result of Pauli exclusion principle and not a true force per se: Everyday objects do not actually touch each other; rather, contact forces are the result of the interactions of the electrons at or near the surfaces of the objects. The atoms in the two surfaces cannot penetrate one another without a large investment of energy because there is no low energy state for which the electron wavefunctions from the two surfaces overlap; thus no microscopic force is needed to prevent this penetration. On the more macroscopic level, such surfaces can be treated as a single object, and two bodies do not penetrate each other due to the stability of matter, which is again a consequence of Pauli exclusion principle, but also of the fundamental forces of nature: Cracks in the bodies do not widen due to electromagnetic forces that create the chemical bonds between the atoms; the atoms themselves do not disintegrate because of the electromagnetic forces between the electrons and the nuclei; and the nuclei do not disintegrate due to the nuclear forces.

As for friction, it is a result of both microscopic adhesion and chemical bond formation due to the electromagnetic force, and of microscopic structures stressing into each other; in the latter phenomena, in order to allow motion, the microscopic structures must either slide one above the other, or must acquire enough energy to break one another. Thus the force acting against motion is a combination of the normal force and of the force required to widen microscopic cracks within matter; the latter force is again due to electromagnetic interaction. Additionally, strain is created inside matter, and this strain is due to a combination of electromagnetic interactions (as electrons are attracted to nuclei and repelled from each other) and of Pauli exclusion principle, the latter working similarly to the case of normal force.

== See also ==
- Non-contact force
- Body force
- Surface force
- Action at a distance (physics)
- Spring force
