= Crocco's theorem =

Aerodynamic theorem

In aerodynamics, Crocco's theorem relates the flow velocity, vorticity, and stagnation pressure (or entropy) of a potential flow. This theorem gives the relation between the thermodynamics and fluid kinematics. The theorem was first enunciated by Alexander Friedmann for the particular case of a perfect gas and published in 1922:

$$\frac{D\mathbf u}{Dt}=T \nabla s-\nabla h$$

However, usually this theorem is connected with the name of Italian scientist Luigi Crocco, a son of Gaetano Crocco.

Consider an element of fluid in the flow field subjected to translational and rotational motion: because stagnation pressure loss and entropy generation can be viewed as essentially the same thing, there are three popular forms for writing Crocco's theorem:

1. Stagnation pressure: $\mathbf u \times \boldsymbol \omega =v \nabla p_0$
2. Entropy (the following form holds for plane steady flows): $T \frac{ds}{dn} = \frac{dh_0}{dn} +u \omega$
3. Momentum: $\frac{\partial \mathbf u}{\partial t} + \nabla \left(\frac{u^2}{2} + h \right) = \mathbf u \times \boldsymbol \omega + T \nabla s + \mathbf{g},$

In the above equations, $\mathbf u$ is the flow velocity vector, $\omega$ is the vorticity, $v$ is the specific volume, $p_0$ is the stagnation pressure, $T$ is temperature, $s$ is specific entropy, $h$ is specific enthalpy, $\mathbf{g}$ is specific body force, and $n$ is the direction normal to the streamlines. All quantities considered (entropy, enthalpy, and body force) are specific, in the sense of "per unit mass".
