= Surface force =

Block on a ramp and corresponding free body diagram of the block showing the surface force from the ramp onto the bottom of the block and separated into two components, a normal force N and a frictional shear force f, along with the body force of gravity mg acting at the center of mass.

Surface force denoted f_{s} is the force that acts across an internal or external surface element in a material body. Normal forces and shear forces between objects are types of surface force. All cohesive forces and contact forces between objects are considered as surface forces. Surface force can be decomposed into two perpendicular components: normal forces and shear forces. A normal force acts normally over an area and a shear force acts tangentially over an area.

== Equations for surface force ==
=== Surface force due to pressure ===
$f_s=p \cdot A \$, where f = force, p = pressure, and A = area on which a uniform pressure acts

== Examples ==
=== Pressure related surface force ===
Since pressure is $\frac{\mathit{force}}{\mathit{area}}=\mathrm{\frac{N}{m^2}}$, and area is a $(length)\cdot(width) = \mathrm{m \cdot m }= \mathrm{m^2}$,

a pressure of $5\ \mathrm{\frac{N}{m^2}} = 5\ \mathrm{Pa}$ over an area of $20\ \mathrm{m^2}$ will produce a surface force of $(5\ \mathrm{Pa}) \cdot (20\ \mathrm{m^2}) = 100\ \mathrm{N}$.

== See also ==
- Body force
- Contact force
