= Pressure gradient =

Space rate of variation of pressure in a given direction

In hydrodynamics and hydrostatics, the pressure gradient (typically of air but more generally of any fluid) is a physical quantity that describes in which direction and at what rate the pressure increases the most rapidly around a particular location. The pressure gradient is a dimensional quantity expressed in units of pascals per metre (Pa/m). Mathematically, it is the gradient of pressure as a function of position. The gradient of pressure in hydrostatics is equal to the body force density (generalised Stevin's Law).

In petroleum geology and the petrochemical sciences pertaining to oil wells, and more specifically within hydrostatics, pressure gradients refer to the gradient of vertical pressure in a column of fluid within a wellbore and are generally expressed in pounds per square inch per foot (psi/ft). This column of fluid is subject to the compound pressure gradient of the overlying fluids. The path and geometry of the column is totally irrelevant; only the vertical depth of the column has any relevance to the vertical pressure of any point within its column and the pressure gradient for any given true vertical depth.

== Physical interpretation ==
The concept of a pressure gradient is a local characterisation of the air (more generally of the fluid under investigation). The pressure gradient is defined only at these spatial scales at which pressure (more generally fluid dynamics) itself is defined.

Within planetary atmospheres (including the Earth's), the pressure gradient is a vector pointing roughly downwards, because the pressure changes most rapidly vertically, increasing downwards (see vertical pressure variation). The value of the strength (or norm) of the pressure gradient in the troposphere is typically of the order of 9 Pa/m (or 90 hPa/km).

The pressure gradient often has a small but critical horizontal component, which is largely responsible for wind circulation in the atmosphere. The horizontal pressure gradient is a two-dimensional vector resulting from the projection of the pressure gradient onto a local horizontal plane. Near the Earth's surface, this horizontal pressure gradient force is directed from higher toward lower pressure. Its particular orientation at any one time and place depends strongly on the weather situation. At mid-latitudes, the typical horizontal pressure gradient may take on values of the order of 10^{−2} Pa/m (or 10 Pa/km), although rather higher values occur within meteorological fronts.

== Weather and climate relevance ==
Interpreting differences in air pressure between different locations is a fundamental component of many meteorological and climatological disciplines, including weather forecasting. As indicated above, the pressure gradient constitutes one of the main forces acting on the air to make it move as wind. Note that the pressure gradient force points from high towards low pressure zones. It is thus oriented in the opposite direction from the pressure gradient itself.

== In acoustics ==
In acoustics, the pressure gradient is proportional to the sound particle acceleration according to Euler's equation. Sound waves and shock waves can induce very large pressure gradients, but these are oscillatory, and often transitory disturbances.

== See also ==
- Adverse pressure gradient
- Force density
- Isobar
- Geopotential height
- Geostrophic wind
- Primitive equations
- Temperature gradient
