= Normal force =

Force exerted on an object by a body with which it is in contact, and vice versa

Figure 1: F_{N} represents the normal force

In mechanics, the normal force $F_N$ is the component of a contact force that is perpendicular to the surface that an object contacts. In this instance, the word normal is used in the geometric sense and means perpendicular, as opposed to its common meaning of "ordinary" or "expected". A person standing still on a platform is acted upon by gravity, which would pull them down towards the Earth's core unless there were a countervailing force from the resistance of the platform's molecules, a force which is named the "normal force".

The normal force is one type of ground reaction force. If the person stands on a slope and does not sink into the ground or slide downhill, the total ground reaction force can be divided into two components: a normal force perpendicular to the ground and a frictional force parallel to the ground. In another common situation, if an object hits a surface with some speed, and the surface can withstand the impact, the normal force provides for a rapid deceleration, which will depend on the flexibility of the surface and the object.

== Equations ==
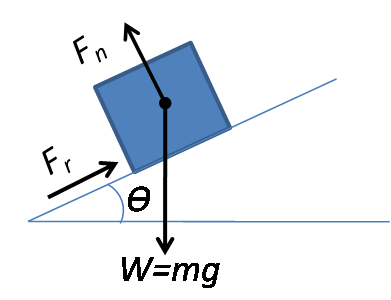
Figure 2: Weight (W), the frictional force (F_{r}), and the normal force (F_{n}) acting on a block. Weight is the product of mass (m) and the acceleration of gravity (g).

In the case of an object resting upon a flat table (unlike on an incline as in Figures 1 and 2), the normal force on the object is equal but in opposite direction to the gravitational force applied on the object (or the weight of the object), that is, $F_n = mg$, where m is mass, and g is the gravitational field strength (about 9.81 N/kg on Earth). The normal force here represents the force applied by the table against the object that prevents it from sinking through the table and requires that the table be sturdy enough to deliver this normal force without breaking. However, it is easy to assume that the normal force and weight are action-reaction force pairs (a common mistake). In this case, the normal force and weight need to be equal in magnitude to explain why there is no upward acceleration of the object. For example, a ball that bounces upwards accelerates upwards because the normal force acting on the ball is larger in magnitude than the weight of the ball.

Where an object rests on an incline as in Figures 1 and 2, the normal force is perpendicular to the plane the object rests on. Still, the normal force will be as large as necessary to prevent sinking through the surface, presuming the surface is sturdy enough. The strength of the force can be calculated as:
$$F_n = mg \cos(\theta)$$
where $F_n$ is the normal force, m is the mass of the object, g is the gravitational field strength, and θ is the angle of the inclined surface measured from the horizontal.

The normal force is one of the several forces which act on the object. In the simple situations so far considered, the most important other forces acting on it are friction and the force of gravity.

=== Using vectors ===
In general, the magnitude of the normal force, N, is the projection of the net surface interaction force, T, in the normal direction, n, and so the normal force vector can be found by scaling the normal direction by the net surface interaction force. The surface interaction force, in turn, is equal to the dot product of the unit normal with the Cauchy stress tensor describing the stress state of the surface. That is:
$$\mathbf{N} = \mathbf{n}\, N = \mathbf{n}\, (\mathbf{T} \cdot \mathbf{n}) = \mathbf{n}\, (\mathbf{n} \cdot \mathbf{\tau} \cdot \mathbf{n}).$$
or, in indicial notation,
$$N_i = n_i N = n_i T_j n_j = n_i n_k \tau_{jk} n_j.$$

The parallel shear component of the contact force is known as the frictional force ($F_{fr}$).

The static coefficient of friction for an object on an inclined plane can be calculated as follows:
$$\mu_s=\tan(\theta)$$
for an object on the point of sliding where $\theta$ is the angle between the slope and the horizontal.

== Physical origin ==
Normal force is directly a result of the Pauli exclusion principle and not a true force per se: it is a result of the interactions of the electrons at the surfaces of the objects. The atoms in the two surfaces cannot penetrate one another without a large investment of energy because there is no low energy state for which the electron wavefunctions from the two surfaces overlap; thus no microscopic force is needed to prevent this penetration. However these interactions are often modeled as van der Waals force, a force that grows very large very quickly as distance becomes smaller.

On the more macroscopic level, such surfaces can be treated as a single object, and two bodies do not penetrate each other due to the stability of matter, which is again a consequence of the Pauli exclusion principle, but also of the fundamental forces of nature: cracks in the bodies do not widen due to electromagnetic forces that create the chemical bonds between the atoms; the atoms themselves do not disintegrate because of the electromagnetic forces between the electrons and the nuclei; and the nuclei do not disintegrate due to the nuclear forces.

== Practical applications ==
In an elevator either stationary or moving at constant velocity, the normal force on the person's feet balances the person's weight. In an elevator that is accelerating upward, the normal force is greater than the person's ground weight and so the person's perceived weight increases (making the person feel heavier). In an elevator that is accelerating downward, the normal force is less than the person's ground weight and so a passenger's perceived weight decreases. If a passenger were to stand on a weighing scale, such as a conventional bathroom scale, while riding the elevator, the scale will be reading the normal force it delivers to the passenger's feet, and will be different than the person's ground weight if the elevator cab is accelerating up or down. The weighing scale measures normal force (which varies as the elevator cab accelerates), not gravitational force (which does not vary as the cab accelerates).

When we define upward to be the positive direction, constructing Newton's second law and solving for the normal force on a passenger yields the following equation:
$$N = m(g + a)$$

In a gravitron amusement ride, the static friction caused by and perpendicular to the normal force acting on the passengers against the walls results in suspension of the passengers above the floor as the ride rotates. In such a scenario, the walls of the ride apply normal force to the passengers in the direction of the center, which is a result of the centripetal force applied to the passengers as the ride rotates. As a result of the normal force experienced by the passengers, the static friction between the passengers and the walls of the ride counteracts the pull of gravity on the passengers, resulting in suspension above ground of the passengers throughout the duration of the ride.

When we define the center of the ride to be the positive direction, solving for the normal force on a passenger that is suspended above ground yields the following equation:
$$N = \frac{mv^2}{r}$$
where $N$ is the normal force on the passenger, $m$ is the mass of the passenger, $v$ is the tangential velocity of the passenger and $r$ is the distance of the passenger from the center of the ride.

With the normal force known, we can solve for the static coefficient of friction needed to maintain a net force of zero in the vertical direction:
$$\mu = \frac{mg}{N}$$
where $\mu$ is the static coefficient of friction, and $g$ is the gravitational field strength.

== See also ==
- Force
- Contact mechanics
- Normal stress
