= Force density =

- Common symbols: $\mathbf{f}$
- SI unit: N·m^{−3}
- In SI base units: kg·m^{−2}·s^{−2}
- Dimension: $\mathsf{L}^{-2} \mathsf{M} \mathsf{T}^{-2}$

In fluid mechanics, the force density is the negative gradient of pressure. It has the physical dimensions of force per unit volume. Force density is a vector field representing the flux density of the hydrostatic force within the bulk of a fluid. Force density is represented by the symbol f, and given by the following equation, where p is the pressure:

$$\mathbf{f} = - \nabla p$$.

The net force on a differential volume element dV of the fluid is:

$$d\mathbf{F} = \mathbf{f}dV$$

Force density acts in different ways which is caused by the boundary conditions. There are stick-slip boundary conditions and stick boundary conditions which affect force density.

In a sphere placed in an arbitrary non-stationary flow field of viscous incompressible fluid for stick boundary conditions where the force density's calculations leads to show the generalisation of Faxen's theorem to force multipole moments of arbitrary order.

In a sphere moving in an incompressible fluid in a non-stationary flow with mixed stick-slip boundary condition where the force of density shows an expression of the Faxén type for the total force, but the total torque and the symmetric force-dipole moment.

The force density at a point in a fluid, divided by the density, is the acceleration of the fluid at that point.

The force density f is defined as the force per unit volume, so that the net force can be calculated by:

$$\mathbf{F}=\int f(\mathbf{r})d^3 \mathbf{r}$$.

The force density in an electromagnetic field is given in CGS by:

$$\mathbf{f}=\rho \mathbf{E}+ \frac{\mathbf{J}}{c} \times \mathbf{B}$$,

where $\rho$ is the charge density, E is the electric field, J is the current density, c is the speed of light, and B is the magnetic field.

== See also ==
- Body force
- Pressure gradient
- Gradient
