= Body force =

Force acting throughout the volume of a body

In physics, a body force is a force that acts throughout the volume of a body. Forces due to gravity, electric fields and magnetic fields are examples of body forces. Body forces contrast with contact forces or surface forces which are exerted to the surface of an object. Fictitious forces such as the centrifugal force, Euler force, and the Coriolis effect are other examples of body forces.

== Definition ==
=== Qualitative ===
A body force is simply a type of force, and so it has the same dimensions as force, [M][L][T]^{−2}. However, it is often convenient to talk about a body force in terms of either the force per unit volume or the force per unit mass. If the force per unit volume is of interest, it is referred to as the force density throughout the system.

A body force is distinct from a contact force in that the force does not require contact for transmission. Thus, common forces associated with pressure gradients and conductive and convective heat transmission are not body forces as they require contact between systems to exist.

More examples of common body forces include

- Gravity,
- Electric forces acting on an object charged throughout its volume,
- Magnetic forces acting on currents within an object, such as the braking force that results from eddy currents,

Fictitious forces (or inertial forces) can be viewed as body forces. Common inertial forces are

- Centrifugal force,
- Coriolis force,
- Euler force (or transverse force), which occurs in a rotating reference frame when the rate of rotation of the frame is changing

However, fictitious forces are not actually forces. Rather they are corrections to Newton's second law when it is formulated in an accelerating reference frame. (Gravity can also be considered a fictitious force in the context of general relativity.)

=== Quantitative ===
The body force density is defined so that the volume integral (throughout a volume of interest) of it gives the total force acting throughout the body,

$$\mathbf{F}_{\mathrm{body}} =  \int\limits_{V}\mathbf{f}(\mathbf{r}) \mathrm{d} V \,,$$

where dV is an infinitesimal volume element, and f is the external body force density field acting on the system.

== Acceleration ==
Like any other force, a body force will cause an object to accelerate. For a non-rigid object, Newton's second law applied to a small volume element is

$$\mathbf{f} (\mathbf{r})=\rho (\mathbf{r})\mathbf{a} (\mathbf{r})$$,

where ρ(r) is the mass density of the substance, f the force density, and a(r) is acceleration, all at point r.

== With gravity ==
In the case of a body in the gravitational field on a planet surface, a(r) is nearly constant (g) and uniform. Near the surface of the Earth,

$g = 9.81 \text{ }\mathrm{m{\cdot}s}^{-2}$.

In this case simply

$$\mathbf{F}_{\mathrm{body}} =  \int\limits_{V}\rho (\mathbf{r})\mathbf{g}\mathrm{d} V = \int\limits_{V}\rho (\mathbf{r})\mathrm{d} V \cdot \mathbf{g} = m \mathbf{g}$$

where m is the mass of the body.

== See also ==
- Action at a distance
- Fictitious force
- Force density
- Non-contact force
- Normal force
- Surface force
