= Osculating orbit =

Orbital perturbations

Osculating orbit (inner, black) and perturbed orbit (red)

In astronomy and astrodynamics the osculating orbit of an object in space at a given moment in time is the orbit it would have around its central body if perturbations were absent. It is the orbit that coincides with the current position and velocity.

== Etymology ==
The word osculate is Latin for "kiss". In mathematics, two curves osculate when they just touch, without (necessarily) crossing, at a point, where both have the same position, slope, and curvature; i.e. the two curves "kiss".

== Kepler elements ==
An osculating orbit and the object's position upon it can be fully described by the six standard Kepler orbital elements (osculating elements), which are easy to calculate as long as one knows the object's position and velocity relative to the central body. The osculating elements would remain constant in the absence of perturbations. Real astronomical orbits experience perturbations that cause the osculating elements to evolve, sometimes very quickly. In cases where general celestial mechanical analyses of the motion have been carried out (as they have been for the major planets, the Moon, and other planetary satellites), the orbit can be described by a set of mean elements with secular and periodic terms. In the case of minor planets, a system of proper orbital elements has been devised to enable representation of the most important aspects of their orbits.

== Perturbations ==
Perturbations that cause an object's osculating orbit to change can arise from:

- A non-spherical component to the central body (when the central body can be modeled neither with a point mass nor with a spherically symmetrical mass distribution, e.g. when it is an oblate spheroid).
- A third body or multiple other bodies whose gravity perturbs the object's orbit, for example the effect of the Moon's gravity on objects orbiting Earth.
- A relativistic correction.
- A non-gravitational force acting on the body, for example force arising from:
  - Thrust from a rocket engine
  - Releasing, leaking, venting or ablation of a material
  - Collisions with other objects
  - Atmospheric drag
  - Radiation pressure
  - Solar wind pressure
  - Switch to a non-inertial reference frame (e.g. when a satellite's orbit is described in a reference frame associated with the precessing equator of the planet).

== Parameters ==
An object's orbital parameters will be different if they are expressed with respect to a non-inertial reference frame (for example, a frame co-precessing with the primary's equator), than if it is expressed with respect to a (non-rotating) inertial reference frame.

Put in more general terms, a perturbed trajectory can be analysed as if assembled of points, each of which is contributed by a curve out of a sequence of curves. Variables parameterising the curves within this family can be called orbital elements. Typically (though not necessarily), these curves are chosen as Keplerian conics, all of which share one focus. In most situations, it is convenient to set each of these curves tangent to the trajectory at the point of intersection. Curves that obey this condition (and also the further condition that they have the same curvature at the point of tangency as would be produced by the object's gravity towards the central body in the absence of perturbing forces) are called osculating, while the variables parameterising these curves are called osculating elements. In some situations, description of orbital motion can be simplified and approximated by choosing orbital elements that are not osculating. Also, in some situations, equations in at least two standard types of orbital elements (Lagrange-type or Delaunay-type), when perturbed, produce elements that turn out to be non-osculating.
