= Non-inertial reference frame =

Reference frame that undergoes acceleration with respect to an inertial frame

A non-inertial reference frame (also known as an accelerated reference frame) is a frame of reference that undergoes acceleration with respect to an inertial frame. An accelerometer at rest in a non-inertial frame will, in general, detect a non-zero acceleration. While the laws of motion are the same in all inertial frames, they vary in non-inertial frames, with apparent motion depending on the acceleration.

In classical mechanics it is often possible to explain the motion of bodies in non-inertial reference frames by introducing additional fictitious forces (also called inertial forces, pseudo-forces, and d'Alembert forces) to Newton's second law. Common examples of this include the Coriolis force and the centrifugal force. In general, the expression for any fictitious force can be derived from the acceleration of the non-inertial frame. As stated by Goodman and Warner, "One might say that F = ma holds in any coordinate system provided the term 'force' is redefined to include the so-called 'reversed effective forces' or 'inertia forces'."

In the theory of general relativity, the curvature of spacetime causes frames to be locally inertial, but globally non-inertial. Due to the non-Euclidean geometry of curved space-time, there are no global inertial reference frames in general relativity. More specifically, the fictitious force which appears in general relativity is the force of gravity.

== Avoiding fictitious forces in calculations ==
In flat spacetime, the use of non-inertial frames can be avoided if desired. Measurements with respect to non-inertial reference frames can always be transformed to an inertial frame, incorporating directly the acceleration of the non-inertial frame as that acceleration as seen from the inertial frame. This approach avoids the use of fictitious forces (it is based on an inertial frame, where fictitious forces are absent, by definition) but it may be less convenient from an intuitive, observational, and even a calculational viewpoint. As pointed out by Ryder for the case of rotating frames as used in meteorology:

A simple way of dealing with this problem is, of course, to transform all coordinates to an inertial system. This is, however, sometimes inconvenient. Suppose, for example, we wish to calculate the movement of air masses in the earth's atmosphere due to pressure gradients. We need the results relative to the rotating frame, the earth, so it is better to stay within this coordinate system if possible. This can be achieved by introducing fictitious (or "non-existent") forces which enable us to apply Newton's Laws of Motion in the same way as in an inertial frame.

— Peter Ryder, Classical Mechanics, pp. 78-79

== Detection of a non-inertial frame: need for fictitious forces ==
An example of a non-inertial reference frame- a rotating reference frame. The point feels a centrifugal force which needs to be compensated to keep rotating. Otherwise, it does not feel Euler force as the rotation rate is constant and it does not feel Coriolis force as it is not moving relative to the rotating frame.

The fact that a given frame is non-inertial can be detected by its need for fictitious forces to explain observed motions. For example, the rotation of the Earth can be observed using a Foucault pendulum. The rotation of the Earth seemingly causes the pendulum to change its plane of oscillation because the surroundings of the pendulum move with the Earth. As seen from an Earth-bound (non-inertial) frame of reference, the explanation of this apparent change in orientation requires the introduction of the fictitious Coriolis force.

Another famous example is that of the tension in the string between two spheres rotating about each other. In that case, the prediction of the measured tension in the string based on the motion of the spheres as observed from a rotating reference frame requires the rotating observers to introduce a fictitious centrifugal force.

In this connection, it may be noted that a change in coordinate system, for example, from Cartesian to polar, if implemented without any change in relative motion, does not cause the appearance of fictitious forces, although the form of the laws of motion varies from one type of curvilinear coordinate system to another.

== Relativistic point of view ==
=== Frames and flat spacetime ===
If a region of spacetime is declared to be Euclidean, and effectively free from obvious gravitational fields, then if an accelerated coordinate system is overlaid onto the same region, it can be said that a uniform fictitious field exists in the accelerated frame (we reserve the word gravitational for the case in which a mass is involved). An object accelerated to be stationary in the accelerated frame will "feel" the presence of the field, and they will also be able to see environmental matter with inertial states of motion (stars, galaxies, etc.) to be apparently falling "downwards" in the field along curved trajectories as if the field is real.

In frame-based descriptions, this supposed field can be made to appear or disappear by switching between "accelerated" and "inertial" coordinate systems.

=== More advanced descriptions ===
As the situation is modeled in finer detail, using the general principle of relativity, the concept of a frame-dependent gravitational field becomes less realistic. In these Machian models, the accelerated body can agree that the apparent gravitational field is associated with the motion of the background matter, but can also claim that the motion of the material as if there is a gravitational field, causes the gravitational field - the accelerating background matter "drags light". Similarly, a background observer can argue that the forced acceleration of the mass causes an apparent gravitational field in the region between it and the environmental material (the accelerated mass also "drags light"). This "mutual" effect, and the ability of an accelerated mass to warp lightbeam geometry and lightbeam-based coordinate systems, is referred to as frame-dragging.

Frame-dragging removes the usual distinction between accelerated frames (which show gravitational effects) and inertial frames (where the geometry is supposedly free from gravitational fields). When a forcibly-accelerated body physically "drags" a coordinate system, the problem becomes an exercise in warped spacetime for all observers.

== See also ==
- Rotating reference frame
- Fictitious force
- Centrifugal force
- Coriolis effect
- Inertial frame of reference
- Free motion equation
