= Euler force =

Force arising in rotating frame of reference

In classical mechanics, the Euler force is the fictitious tangential force that appears when a non-uniformly rotating reference frame is used for analysis of motion and there is variation in the angular velocity of the reference frame's axes. The Euler acceleration (named for Leonhard Euler), also known as azimuthal acceleration or transverse acceleration, is that part of the absolute acceleration that is caused by the variation in the angular velocity of the reference frame.

== Intuitive example ==
The Euler force will be felt by a person riding a merry-go-round. As the ride starts, the Euler force will be the apparent force pushing the person to the back of the horse; and as the ride comes to a stop, it will be the apparent force pushing the person towards the front of the horse. A person on a horse close to the perimeter of the merry-go-round will perceive a greater apparent force than a person on a horse closer to the axis of rotation. Of the three fictitious forces that appear in a rotating reference frame, only the Euler force results from rotation speeding up or slowing down.

== Mathematical description ==
The direction and magnitude of the Euler acceleration is given, in the rotating reference frame, by:

$$\mathbf{a}_\mathrm{Euler} = - \frac{d\boldsymbol\omega}{dt} \times \mathbf{r},$$

where ω is the angular velocity of rotation of the reference frame and r is the vector position of the point in the reference frame. The Euler force on an object of mass m in the rotating reference frame is then

$$\mathbf{F}_\mathrm{Euler} = m \mathbf{a}_\mathrm{Euler} = - m \frac{d\boldsymbol\omega}{dt} \times \mathbf{r}.$$

== See also ==
- Coriolis effect
- Centrifugal force
- Rotating reference frame
- Angular acceleration
