= Rotating reference frame =

Concept in classical mechanics

In the inertial frame of reference (upper part of the picture), the black ball moves in a straight line. However, the observer (red dot) who is standing in the rotating/non-inertial frame of reference (lower part of the picture) sees the object as following a curved path due to the Coriolis and centrifugal forces present in this frame.

A rotating frame of reference is a special case of a non-inertial reference frame that is rotating relative to an inertial reference frame. An everyday example of a rotating reference frame is the surface of the Earth. (Note: This article considers only frames rotating about a fixed axis. For more general rotations, see Euler angles.)

== Fictitious forces ==
All non-inertial reference frames exhibit fictitious forces; rotating reference frames are characterized by three:

- the centrifugal force,
- the Coriolis force,

and, for non-uniformly rotating reference frames,

- the Euler force.

Scientists in a rotating box can measure the rotation speed and axis of rotation by measuring these fictitious forces. For example, Léon Foucault was able to show the Coriolis force that results from Earth's rotation using the Foucault pendulum. If Earth were to rotate many times faster, these fictitious forces could be felt by humans, as they are when on a spinning carousel.

=== Centrifugal force ===
In classical mechanics, centrifugal force is an outward force associated with rotation. Centrifugal force is one of several so-called pseudo-forces (also known as inertial forces), so named because, unlike real forces, they do not originate in interactions with other bodies situated in the environment of the particle upon which they act. Instead, centrifugal force originates in the rotation of the frame of reference within which observations are made.

=== Coriolis force ===
The mathematical expression for the Coriolis force appeared in an 1835 paper by a French scientist Gaspard-Gustave Coriolis in connection with hydrodynamics, and also in the tidal equations of Pierre-Simon Laplace in 1778. Early in the 20th century, the term Coriolis force began to be used in connection with meteorology.

Perhaps the most commonly encountered rotating reference frame is the Earth. Moving objects on the surface of the Earth experience a Coriolis force, and appear to veer to the right in the Northern Hemisphere, and to the left in the Southern Hemisphere. Movements of air in the atmosphere and water in the ocean are notable examples of this behavior: rather than flowing directly from areas of high pressure to low pressure, as they would on a non-rotating planet, winds and currents tend to flow to the right of this direction north of the equator, and to the left of this direction south of the equator. This effect is responsible for the rotation of large cyclones (see Coriolis effects in meteorology).

=== Euler force ===
In classical mechanics, the Euler acceleration (named for Leonhard Euler), also known as azimuthal acceleration or transverse acceleration is an acceleration that appears when a non-uniformly rotating reference frame is used for analysis of motion and there is variation in the angular velocity of the reference frame's axis. This article is restricted to a frame of reference that rotates about a fixed axis.

The Euler force is a fictitious force on a body that is related to the Euler acceleration by F = ma, where a is the Euler acceleration and m is the mass of the body.

== Relating rotating frames to stationary frames ==
The following is a derivation of the formulas for accelerations as well as fictitious forces in a rotating frame. It begins with the relation between a particle's coordinates in a rotating frame and its coordinates in an inertial (stationary) frame. Then, by taking time derivatives, formulas are derived that relate the velocity of the particle as seen in the two frames, and the acceleration relative to each frame. Using these accelerations, the fictitious forces are identified by comparing Newton's second law as formulated in the two different frames.

=== Relation between positions in the two frames ===
To derive these fictitious forces, it's helpful to be able to convert between the coordinates $\left(x', y', z'\right)$ of the rotating reference frame and the coordinates $(x, y, z)$ of an inertial reference frame with the same origin. (Note: So $x', y', z'$ are functions of $x, y, z,$ and time $t.$ Similarly $x, y, z$ are functions of $x', y', z',$ and $t.$ That these reference frames have the same origin means that for all $t,$ $\left(x', y', z'\right) = (0, 0, 0)$ if and only if $(x, y, z) = (0, 0, 0).$) If the rotation is about the $z$ axis with a constant angular velocity $\Omega$ (so $z' = z$ and $\frac{\mathrm{d} \theta}{\mathrm{d} t} \equiv \Omega,$ which implies $\theta(t) = \Omega t + \theta_0$ for some constant $\theta_0$ where $\theta(t)$ denotes the angle in the $x-y$-plane formed at time $t$ by $\left(x', y'\right)$ and the $x$-axis), and if the two reference frames coincide at time $t = 0$ (meaning $\left(x', y', z'\right) = (x, y, z)$ when $t = 0,$ so take $\theta_0 = 0$ or some other integer multiple of $2\pi$), the transformation from rotating coordinates to inertial coordinates can be written
$$x = x'\cos(\theta(t)) - y'\sin(\theta(t))$$
$$y = x'\sin(\theta(t)) + y'\cos(\theta(t))$$
whereas the reverse transformation is
$$x' = x\cos(-\theta(t)) - y\sin(-\theta(t))$$
$$y' = x\sin( -\theta(t)) + y\cos(-\theta(t)) \ .$$

This result can be obtained from a rotation matrix.

Introduce the unit vectors $\hat{\boldsymbol{\imath}},\ \hat{\boldsymbol{\jmath}},\ \hat{\boldsymbol{k}}$ representing standard unit basis vectors in the rotating frame. The time-derivatives of these unit vectors are found next. Suppose the frames are aligned at $t = 0$ and the $z$-axis is the axis of rotation. Then for a counterclockwise rotation through angle $\Omega t$:
$$\hat{\boldsymbol{\imath}}(t) = (\cos\theta(t),\ \sin \theta(t))$$
where the $(x, y)$ components are expressed in the stationary frame. Likewise,
$$\hat{\boldsymbol{\jmath}}(t) = (-\sin \theta(t),\ \cos \theta(t)) \ .$$

Thus the time derivative of these vectors, which rotate without changing magnitude, is
$$\frac{\mathrm{d}}{\mathrm{d}t}\hat{\boldsymbol{\imath}}(t) = \Omega (-\sin \theta(t), \ \cos \theta(t))=  \Omega \hat{\boldsymbol{\jmath}} \ ;$$
$$\frac{\mathrm{d}}{\mathrm{d}t}\hat{\boldsymbol{\jmath}}(t) = \Omega (-\cos \theta(t), \ -\sin \theta(t))= - \Omega \hat{\boldsymbol{\imath}} \ ,$$
where $\Omega \equiv \frac{\mathrm{d}}{\mathrm{d}t}\theta(t).$ This result is the same as found using a vector cross product with the rotation vector $\boldsymbol{\Omega}$ pointed along the z-axis of rotation $\boldsymbol{\Omega} = (0,\ 0,\ \Omega),$ namely,
$$\frac{\mathrm{d}}{\mathrm{d}t}\hat{\boldsymbol{u}} = \boldsymbol{\Omega \times}\hat{\boldsymbol{u}} \ ,$$
where $\hat{\boldsymbol{u}}$ is either $\hat{\boldsymbol{\imath}}$ or $\hat{\boldsymbol{\jmath}}.$

=== Time derivatives in the two frames ===
Introduce unit vectors $\hat{\boldsymbol{\imath}},\ \hat{\boldsymbol{\jmath}},\ \hat{\boldsymbol{k}}$, now representing standard unit basis vectors in the general rotating frame. As they rotate they will remain normalized and perpendicular to each other. If they rotate at the speed of $\Omega(t)$ about an axis along the rotation vector $\boldsymbol {\Omega}(t)$ then each unit vector $\hat{\boldsymbol{u}}$ of the rotating coordinate system (such as $\hat{\boldsymbol{\imath}},\ \hat{\boldsymbol{\jmath}},$ or $\hat{\boldsymbol{k}}$) abides by the following equation:
$$\frac{\mathrm{d}}{\mathrm{d}t}\hat{\boldsymbol{u}} = \boldsymbol{\Omega} \times \boldsymbol{\hat{u}} \ .$$
So if $R(t)$ denotes the transformation taking basis vectors of the inertial- to the rotating frame, with matrix columns equal to the basis vectors of the rotating frame, then the cross product multiplication by the rotation vector is given by $\boldsymbol{\Omega}\times = R'(t)\cdot R(t)^T$.

If $\boldsymbol{f}$ is a vector function that is written as (Note: So $f_1, f_2, f_3$ are $\boldsymbol{f}$'s coordinates with respect to the rotating basis vector $\hat{\boldsymbol{\imath}},\ \hat{\boldsymbol{\jmath}},\ \hat{\boldsymbol{k}}$ ($\boldsymbol{f}$'s coordinates with respect to the inertial frame are not used). Consequently, at any given instant, the rate of change of $\boldsymbol{f}$ with respect to these rotating coordinates is $\frac{\mathrm{d}f_1}{\mathrm{d}t}\hat{\boldsymbol{\imath}} + \frac{\mathrm{d}f_2}{\mathrm{d}t}\hat{\boldsymbol{\jmath}} + \frac{\mathrm{d}f_3}{\mathrm{d}t}\hat{\boldsymbol{k}}.$ So for example, if $f_1 \equiv 1$ and $f_2 = f_3 \equiv 0$ are constants, then $\boldsymbol{f} \equiv \hat{\boldsymbol{\imath}}$ is just one of the rotating basis vectors and (as expected) its time rate of change with respect to these rotating coordinates is identically $\boldsymbol{0}$ (so the formula for $\frac{\mathrm{d}}{\mathrm{d}t} \boldsymbol{f}$ given below implies that the derivative at time $t$ of this rotating basis vector $\boldsymbol{f} \equiv \hat{\boldsymbol{\imath}}$ is $\frac{\mathrm{d}}{\mathrm{d}t} \boldsymbol{i} = \boldsymbol{\Omega}(t) \times \boldsymbol{i}(t)$); however, its rate of change with respect to the non-rotating inertial frame will not be constantly $\boldsymbol{0}$ except (of course) in the case where $\hat{\boldsymbol{\imath}}$ is not moving in the inertial frame (this happens, for instance, when the axis of rotation is fixed as the $z$-axis (assuming standard coordinates) in the inertial frame and also $\hat{\boldsymbol{\imath}} \equiv (0, 0, 1)$ or $\hat{\boldsymbol{\imath}} \equiv (0, 0, -1)$).)
$$\boldsymbol{f}(t)=f_1(t) \hat{\boldsymbol{\imath}}+f_2(t) \hat{\boldsymbol{\jmath}}+f_3(t) \hat{\boldsymbol{k}}\ ,$$
and we want to examine its first derivative then (using the product rule of differentiation):
$$\begin{align}
\frac{\mathrm{d}}{\mathrm{d}t}\boldsymbol{f}
&= \frac{\mathrm{d}f_1}{\mathrm{d}t}\hat{\boldsymbol{\imath}} + \frac{\mathrm{d}\hat{\boldsymbol{\imath}}}{\mathrm{d}t}f_1 + \frac{\mathrm{d}f_2}{\mathrm{d}t}\hat{\boldsymbol{\jmath}} + \frac{\mathrm{d}\hat{\boldsymbol{\jmath}}}{\mathrm{d}t}f_2 + \frac{\mathrm{d}f_3}{\mathrm{d}t}\hat{\boldsymbol{k}} + \frac{\mathrm{d}\hat{\boldsymbol{k}}}{\mathrm{d}t}f_3 \\
&= \left[\frac{\mathrm{d}f_1}{\mathrm{d}t}\hat{\boldsymbol{\imath}} + \frac{\mathrm{d}f_2}{\mathrm{d}t}\hat{\boldsymbol{\jmath}} + \frac{\mathrm{d}f_3}{\mathrm{d}t}\hat{\boldsymbol{k}} \right] + \left[\frac{\mathrm{d}\hat{\boldsymbol{\imath}}}{\mathrm{d}t}f_1 + \frac{\mathrm{d}\hat{\boldsymbol{\jmath}}}{\mathrm{d}t}f_2 + \frac{\mathrm{d}\hat{\boldsymbol{k}}}{\mathrm{d}t}f_3 \right]\\
&= \left[ \frac{\mathrm{d}f_1}{\mathrm{d}t}\hat{\boldsymbol{\imath}} + \frac{\mathrm{d}f_2}{\mathrm{d}t}\hat{\boldsymbol{\jmath}} + \frac{\mathrm{d}f_3}{\mathrm{d}t}\hat{\boldsymbol{k}} \right] + \left[\boldsymbol{\Omega} \times \left(f_1 \hat{\boldsymbol{\imath}} + f_2 \hat{\boldsymbol{\jmath}} + f_3 \hat{\boldsymbol{k}}\right)\right] \\
&= \left( \frac{\mathrm{d}\boldsymbol{f}}{\mathrm{d}t}\right)_{\mathrm{r}} + \boldsymbol{\Omega} \times \boldsymbol{f}
\end{align}$$
where $\left( \frac{\mathrm{d}\boldsymbol{f}}{\mathrm{d}t}\right)_{\mathrm{r}}$ denotes the rate of change of $\boldsymbol{f}$ as observed in the rotating coordinate system. As a shorthand the differentiation is expressed as:
$$\frac{\mathrm{d}}{\mathrm{d}t}\boldsymbol{f} = \left[ \left(\frac{\mathrm{d}}{\mathrm{d}t}\right)_{\mathrm{r}} + \boldsymbol{\Omega} \times \right] \boldsymbol{f} \ .$$

This result is also known as the transport theorem in analytical dynamics and is also sometimes referred to as the basic kinematic equation.

=== Relation between velocities in the two frames ===
A velocity of an object is the time-derivative of the object's position, so

$$\mathbf{v} \ \stackrel{\mathrm{def}}{=}\   \frac{\mathrm{d}\mathbf{r}}{\mathrm{d}t} \ .$$

The time derivative of a position $\boldsymbol{r}(t)$ in a rotating reference frame has two components, one from the explicit time dependence due to motion of the object itself in the rotating reference frame, and another from the frame's own rotation. Applying the result of the previous subsection to the displacement $\boldsymbol{r}(t),$ the velocities in the two reference frames are related by the equation

$$\mathbf{v_i} \ \stackrel{\mathrm{def}}{=}\
\left({\frac{\mathrm{d}\mathbf{r}}{\mathrm{d}t}}\right)_{\mathrm{i}} \ \stackrel{\mathrm{def}}{=}\
\frac{\mathrm{d}\mathbf{r}}{\mathrm{d}t} =
\left[ \left(\frac{\mathrm{d}}{\mathrm{d}t}\right)_{\mathrm{r}} + \boldsymbol{\Omega} \times \right] \boldsymbol{r} =
\left(\frac{\mathrm{d}\mathbf{r}}{\mathrm{d}t}\right)_{\mathrm{r}} + \boldsymbol\Omega \times \mathbf{r} =
\mathbf{v}_{\mathrm{r}} + \boldsymbol\Omega \times \mathbf{r} \ ,$$

where subscript $\mathrm{i}$ means the inertial frame of reference, and $\mathrm{r}$ means the rotating frame of reference.

=== Relation between accelerations in the two frames ===
Acceleration is the second time derivative of position, or the first time derivative of velocity

$$\mathbf{a}_{\mathrm{i}} \ \stackrel{\mathrm{def}}{=}\
\left( \frac{\mathrm{d}^{2}\mathbf{r}}{\mathrm{d}t^{2}}\right)_{\mathrm{i}} =
\left( \frac{\mathrm{d}\mathbf{v}}{\mathrm{d}t} \right)_{\mathrm{i}} =
\left[  \left( \frac{\mathrm{d}}{\mathrm{d}t} \right)_{\mathrm{r}} + \boldsymbol\Omega \times \right]
\left[\left( \frac{\mathrm{d}\mathbf{r}}{\mathrm{d}t} \right)_{\mathrm{r}} + \boldsymbol\Omega \times \mathbf{r} \right] \ ,$$

where subscript $\mathrm{i}$ means the inertial frame of reference, $\mathrm{r}$ the rotating frame of reference, and where the expression, again, $\boldsymbol\Omega \times$ in the bracketed expression on the left is to be interpreted as an operator working onto the bracketed expression on the right.

As $\boldsymbol\Omega\times\boldsymbol\Omega=\boldsymbol 0$, the first time derivatives of $\boldsymbol\Omega$ inside either frame, when expressed with respect to the basis of e.g. the inertial frame, coincide. Carrying out the differentiations and re-arranging some terms yields the acceleration relative to the rotating reference frame, $\mathbf{a}_{\mathrm{r}}$

$$\mathbf{a}_{\mathrm{r}} =
\mathbf{a}_{\mathrm{i}} -
2 \boldsymbol\Omega \times \mathbf{v}_{\mathrm{r}} -
\boldsymbol\Omega \times (\boldsymbol\Omega \times \mathbf{r}) -
\frac{\mathrm{d}\boldsymbol\Omega}{\mathrm{d}t} \times \mathbf{r}$$

where $\mathbf{a}_{\mathrm{r}} \ \stackrel{\mathrm{def}}{=}\ \left( \tfrac{\mathrm{d}^{2}\mathbf{r}}{\mathrm{d}t^{2}} \right)_{\mathrm{r}}$ is the apparent acceleration in the rotating reference frame, the term $-\boldsymbol\Omega \times (\boldsymbol\Omega \times \mathbf{r})$ represents centrifugal acceleration, and the term $-2 \boldsymbol\Omega \times \mathbf{v}_{\mathrm{r}}$ is the Coriolis acceleration. The last term, $-\tfrac{\mathrm{d}\boldsymbol\Omega}{\mathrm{d}t} \times \mathbf{r}$, is the Euler acceleration and is zero in uniformly rotating frames.

=== Newton's second law in the two frames ===
When the expression for acceleration is multiplied by the mass of the particle, the three extra terms on the right-hand side result in fictitious forces in the rotating reference frame, that is, apparent forces that result from being in a non-inertial reference frame, rather than from any physical interaction between bodies.

Using Newton's second law of motion $\mathbf{F}=m\mathbf{a},$ we obtain:

- the Coriolis force
  $$\mathbf{F}_{\mathrm{Coriolis}} =
-2m \boldsymbol\Omega \times \mathbf{v}_{\mathrm{r}}$$
- the centrifugal force
  $$\mathbf{F}_{\mathrm{centrifugal}} =
-m\boldsymbol\Omega \times (\boldsymbol\Omega \times \mathbf{r})$$
- and the Euler force
  $$\mathbf{F}_{\mathrm{Euler}} =
-m\frac{\mathrm{d}\boldsymbol\Omega}{\mathrm{d}t} \times \mathbf{r}$$

where $m$ is the mass of the object being acted upon by these fictitious forces. Notice that all three forces vanish when the frame is not rotating, that is, when $\boldsymbol{\Omega} = 0 \ .$

For completeness, the inertial acceleration $\mathbf{a}_{\mathrm{i}}$ due to impressed external forces $\mathbf{F}_{\mathrm{imp}}$ can be determined from the total physical force in the inertial (non-rotating) frame (for example, force from physical interactions such as electromagnetic forces) using Newton's second law in the inertial frame:
$$\mathbf{F}_{\mathrm{imp}} = m \mathbf{a}_{\mathrm{i}}$$
Newton's law in the rotating frame then becomes

$$\mathbf{F_{\mathrm{r}}} = \mathbf{F}_{\mathrm{imp}} + \mathbf{F}_{\mathrm{centrifugal}} +\mathbf{F}_{\mathrm{Coriolis}} + \mathbf{F}_{\mathrm{Euler}} = m\mathbf{a_{\mathrm{r}}} \ .$$

In other words, to handle the laws of motion in a rotating reference frame:

Treat the fictitious forces like real forces, and pretend you are in an inertial frame.

— Louis N. Hand, Janet D. Finch Analytical Mechanics, p. 267

Obviously, a rotating frame of reference is a case of a non-inertial frame. Thus the particle in addition to the real force is acted upon by a fictitious force...The particle will move according to Newton's second law of motion if the total force acting on it is taken as the sum of the real and fictitious forces.

— HS Hans & SP Pui: Mechanics; p. 341

This equation has exactly the form of Newton's second law, except that in addition to F, the sum of all forces identified in the inertial frame, there is an extra term on the right...This means we can continue to use Newton's second law in the noninertial frame provided we agree that in the noninertial frame we must add an extra force-like term, often called the inertial force.

— John R. Taylor: Classical Mechanics; p. 328

== Use in magnetic resonance ==
It is convenient to consider magnetic resonance in a frame that rotates at the Larmor frequency of the spins. This is illustrated in the animation below. The rotating wave approximation may also be used.

Animation showing the rotating frame. The red arrow is a spin in the Bloch sphere which precesses in the laboratory frame due to a static magnetic field. In the rotating frame the spin remains still until a resonantly oscillating magnetic field drives magnetic resonance.

== See also ==
- Absolute rotation
- Co-rotating frame of reference
- Centrifugal force (rotating reference frame) Centrifugal force as seen from systems rotating about a fixed axis
- Coriolis force The effect of the Coriolis force on the Earth and other rotating systems
- Inertial frame of reference
- Non-inertial frame
- Fictitious force A more general treatment of the subject of this article
