= 2MASS J03480772−6022270 =

Brown dwarf in the constellation Reticulum

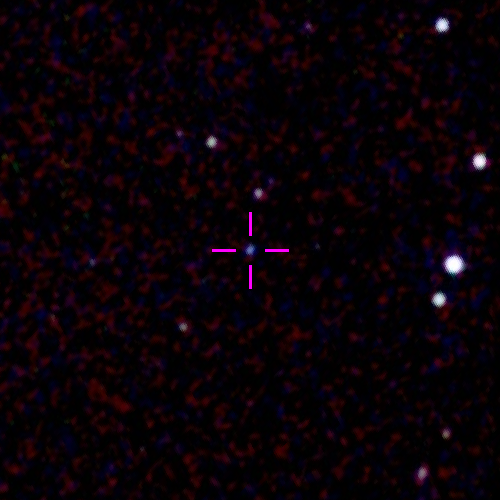
- 2MASS near-infrared image of 2MASS J0348−6022 (center)

Observation data Epoch J2000 Equinox J2000
- Constellation: Reticulum
- Right ascension: 03^{h} 48^{m} 07.721^{s}
- Declination: –60° 22′ 27.062″

Characteristics
- Spectral type: T7
- Apparent magnitude (J): 15.318 ± 0.050
- Apparent magnitude (H): 15.559 ± 0.143
- Apparent magnitude (K): 15.602 ± 0.230

Astrometry
Radial velocity (R_{v})	−14.1 ± 3.7 km/s
Proper motion (μ)	RA: –279.7 ± 0.6 mas/yr Dec.: –768.5 ± 0.7 mas/yr
Parallax (π)	120.1±1.8 mas
Distance	27.2 ± 0.4 ly (8.3 ± 0.1 pc)

Details
Mass	0.041+0.021 −0.017 M_{☉}
Radius	0.093+0.016 −0.010 R_{☉}
Surface gravity (log g)	5.1 ± 0.3 cgs
Temperature	880 ± 110 K
Rotation	1.080+0.004 −0.005 h
Rotational velocity (v sin i)	103.5 ± 7.4 km/s
Age	3.5+11.5 −2.9 Gyr

Other designations
- WISE J034807.33-602234.9, WISEA J034807.33-602235.2, WISEP J034807.34-602234.9, UGCS J121951.36+312849.4, TIC 237922091

Database references
SIMBAD	data

2MASS J03480772−6022270 (abbreviated to 2MASS J0348−6022) is a brown dwarf of spectral class T7, located in the constellation Reticulum approximately 27.2 light-years from the Sun. It was discovered by astronomer Adam Burgasser and collaborators of the 2MASS Wide-Field T Dwarf Search in 2002. With a rotation period of 1.08 hours, it is the fastest-rotating brown dwarf confirmed as of 2022. The rotational velocity at its equator is over 100 km/s (62 mi/s), approaching the predicted rotational speed limit beyond which it would break apart due to centripetal forces. As a consequence of its rapid rotation, the brown dwarf is slightly flattened at its poles to a similar degree as Saturn, the most oblate planet in the Solar System. Its rapid rotation may enable strong auroral radio emissions via charged particle interactions in its magnetic field, as observed in other known rapidly-rotating brown dwarfs.

== Discovery ==
2MASS J0348−6022 was first catalogued as a point source in June 2003 by the Two Micron All-Sky Survey (2MASS) organized by the University of Massachusetts Amherst and the Infrared Processing and Analysis Center under the California Institute of Technology. It was discovered to be a brown dwarf of the spectral class T7 by Adam Burgasser and collaborators of the 2MASS Wide-Field T Dwarf Search, based on spectra in the near-infrared region of the electromagnetic spectrum obtained in September 2002 with the Víctor M. Blanco Telescope at the Cerro Tololo Inter-American Observatory, Chile. Their discovery and characterization of 2MASS J0348−6022 along with two other T dwarfs located in the southern celestial hemisphere was published in The Astronomical Journal in November 2003.

== Location and proper motion ==
2MASS J0348−6022 is located in the southern celestial hemisphere in the constellation Reticulum. Its equatorial coordinates based on the J2000 epoch are: RA 03^{h} 48^{m} 07.72^{s} and Dec –60° 22′ 27.0″. These coordinates in sexagesimal notation are displayed in its identifier 2MASS J03480772−6022270. The trigonometric parallax of 2MASS J0348−6022 has been measured to be 120.1±1.8 milliarcseconds, from 16 observations by the New Technology Telescope (NTT) collected over 6.4 years. This corresponds to a distance of 8.3 ± 0.1 parsecs (27.2 ± 0.4 ly). A previous estimate by Burgasser and collaborators from the spectrophotometric relation of spectral type and near-infrared absolute magnitude resulted in a value of 9 ± 4 parsecs (29 ± 13 ly), based on 2MASS JHK-band photometry.

The NTT has also measured the proper motion of 2MASS J0348−6022 in two directions: RA −279.7±0.6 mas/yr and Dec −768.5±0.7 mas/yr, which indicate motion in south-west direction on the sky. Given the distance estimate from trigonometric parallax, the corresponding tangential velocity is 32.3±0.5 km/s, consistent with the kinematics of the stars of the Galactic disk.

== Spectral class ==
2MASS J0348−6022 is classified as a late T-type brown dwarf with the spectral class T7, distinguished by the presence of strong methane (CH_{4}) and water (H_{2}O) absorption bands in its near-infrared spectrum between wavelengths 1.2 and 2.35 μm. The near-infrared spectrum of 2MASS J0348−6022 also displays a pair of narrow absorption lines at 1.243 and 1.252 μm, which are attributed to the presence of neutral potassium (K I) in the brown dwarf's atmosphere. Compared to other T dwarfs, the K I doublet lines in 2MASS J0348−6022's spectrum appear relatively faded due to its late spectral type; K I doublet lines are typically more prominent in the spectra of early- and mid-type T dwarfs as well as late-type L and M dwarfs. Absorption bands of iron(I) hydride (FeH) have also been found in 2MASS J0348−6022's spectrum between 1.72–1.78 μm.

Like most T dwarfs, the optical and near-infrared color of 2MASS J0348−6022 is very red. The near-infrared 2MASS color indices are J–H = −0.24±0.16 and H–K = −0.04±0.28, indicating that the brown dwarf appears brighter in longer (thus redder) wavelengths of light.

== Physical properties ==
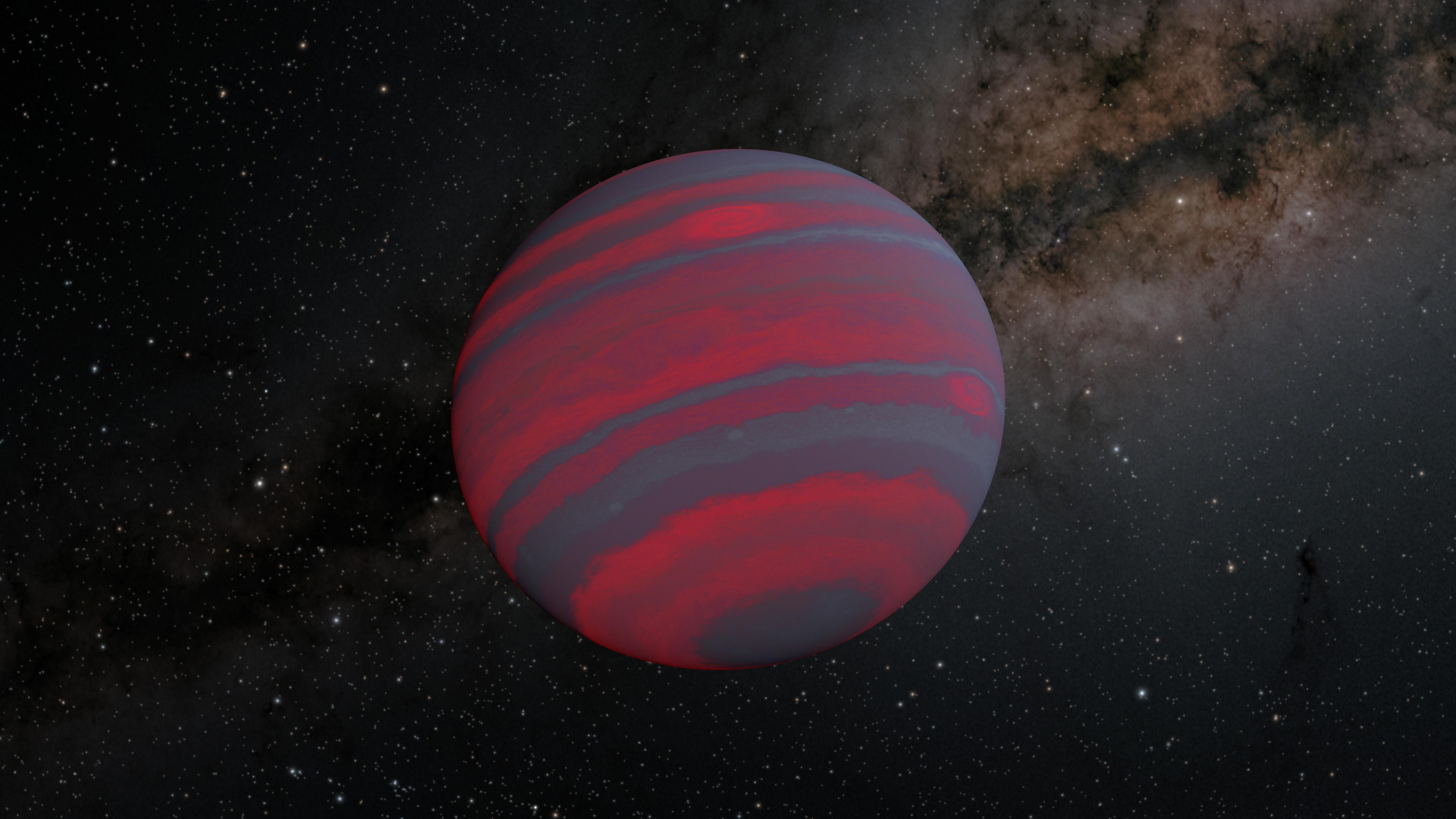
Artist's impression of an oblate brown dwarf with narrow atmospheric bands

The near-infrared spectrum of a brown dwarf can be modelled by a photosphere primarily defined by two fixed intrinsic properties: effective temperature (T_{eff}) and surface gravity (log g). In a 2021 study, Megan Tannock and collaborators compared the near-infrared spectrum of 2MASS J0348−6022 to various published photospheric models and derived multiple best-fit solutions for its effective temperature and surface gravity. They took a weighted mean of these best-fit solutions and adopted the following values for these two fundamental properties: T_{eff} = 880±110 K and log g = 5.1±0.3 dex (10^{5.1} times Earth's gravity in centimetre-gram-second units). From photospheric modeling they were also able to determine 2MASS J0348−6022's radial velocity and projected rotational velocity, which facilitated the confirmation of the brown dwarf's rapid rotation.

The mass, radius, and age of 2MASS J0348−6022 are estimated by interpolation of brown dwarf evolutionary models based on effective temperature and surface gravity. From their adopted effective temperature and surface gravity values from photospheric modelling, Tannock and collaborators derive a mass of 0.041+0.021
−0.017 M_{☉} (~43 M_{Jup}), a Jupiter-like equatorial radius of 0.093+0.016
−0.010 R_{☉} (69,700 km), and an age of 3.5+11.5
−2.9 billion years. The high estimated age of 2MASS J0348−6022 is due to its late T-type spectral class, which is generally expected to describe the later evolutionary stages of brown dwarfs as they cool.

== Rotation ==
=== Photometric variability and periodicity ===
2MASS J0348−6022 is the fastest-rotating brown dwarf confirmed as of 2022, with a photometric periodicity of 1.080+0.004
−0.005 hours. (Note: The T dwarfs 2MASS J0718−6415 (1.080+0.004 −0.003 h) and WISEPC J1122+2550 (~0.288 h) may have comparable—if not faster—rotation periods than 2MASS J0348−6022, but both of their measurements are tentative due to possible aliasing or distance uncertainties.) It along with L dwarfs 2MASS J1219+3128 and 2MASS J0407+1546 have had their short rotation periods measured and studied in detail in 2021 by Megan Tannock and collaborators using data from the Spitzer Space Telescope. The double-peaked light curve of 2MASS J0348−6022 may indicate the presence of two dominant photospheric spots configured on opposite hemispheres of the brown dwarf.

Photometric variability in 2MASS J0348−6022 was first reported in 2008 by Fraser Clarke and collaborators using the New Technology Telescope's (NTT) near-infrared spectrograph. They reported an upper limit J-band amplitude of <1% in a six hour observation period. Likewise, astrophysicist Jacqueline Radigan estimated a J-band amplitude of <1.1%±0.4% in an independent analysis of 2011–2012 NTT observations published by Paul Wilson and collaborators in 2014, who initially derived a spuriously high amplitude of 2.4%±0.5% due to systematic errors in their measurement. Low-amplitude (<2%) variability is common among brown dwarfs of all spectral types, and is presumed to be the result of patchy photospheres with subtle heterogeneities.

Infrared observations by the Spitzer Space Telescope show that 2MASS J0348−6022's brightness appears flat in the Infrared Array Camera's 3.6 μm band and only exhibits discernible variability in the 4.5 μm band, a behavior typical of previously observed T dwarfs. This can be explained by the presence of CH_{4} in its atmosphere, which is opaque to wavelengths around 3.3 μm.

=== Physical effects ===
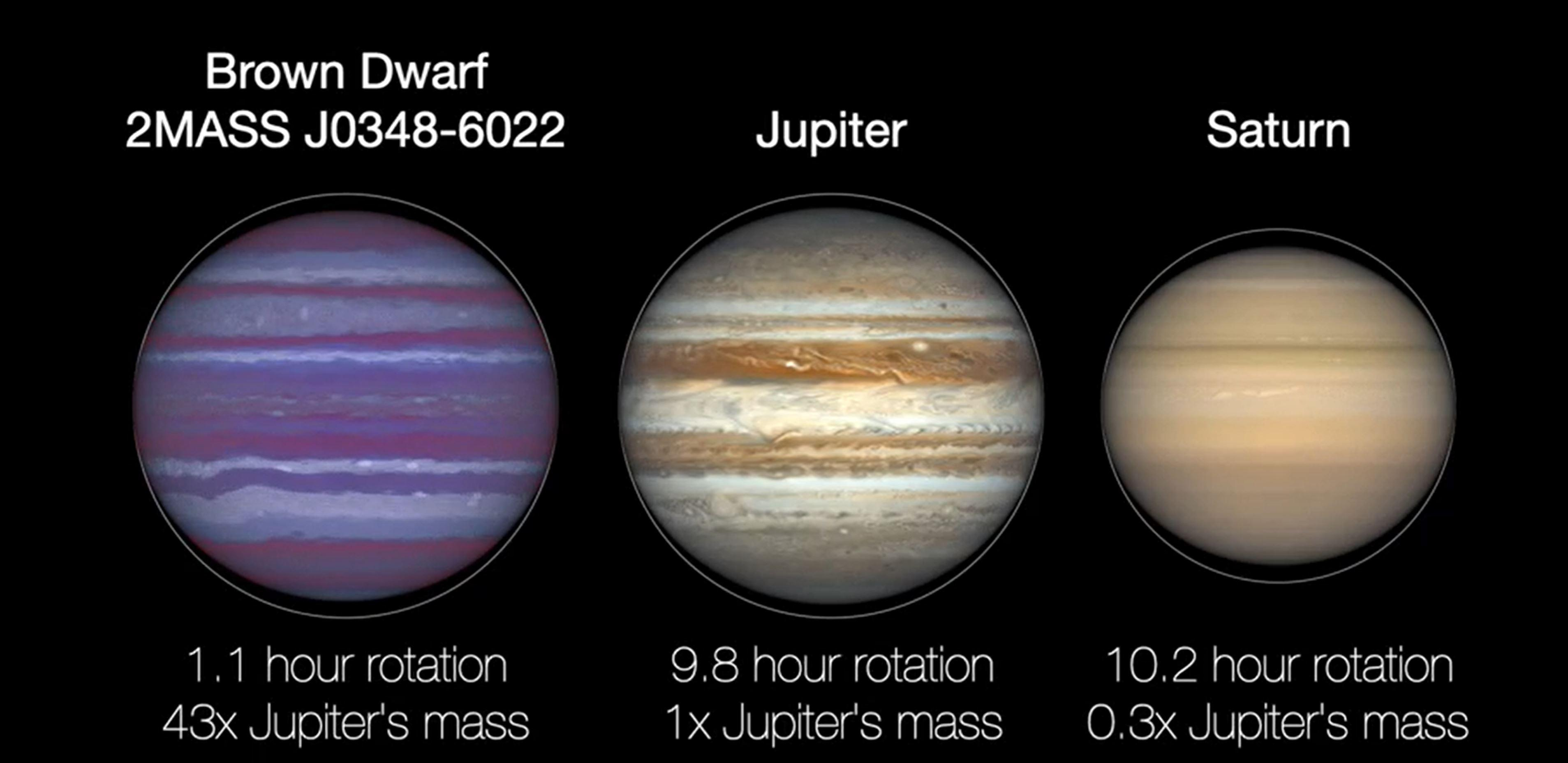
Oblateness and size comparison of 2MASS J0348−6022 to Solar System planets Jupiter and Saturn

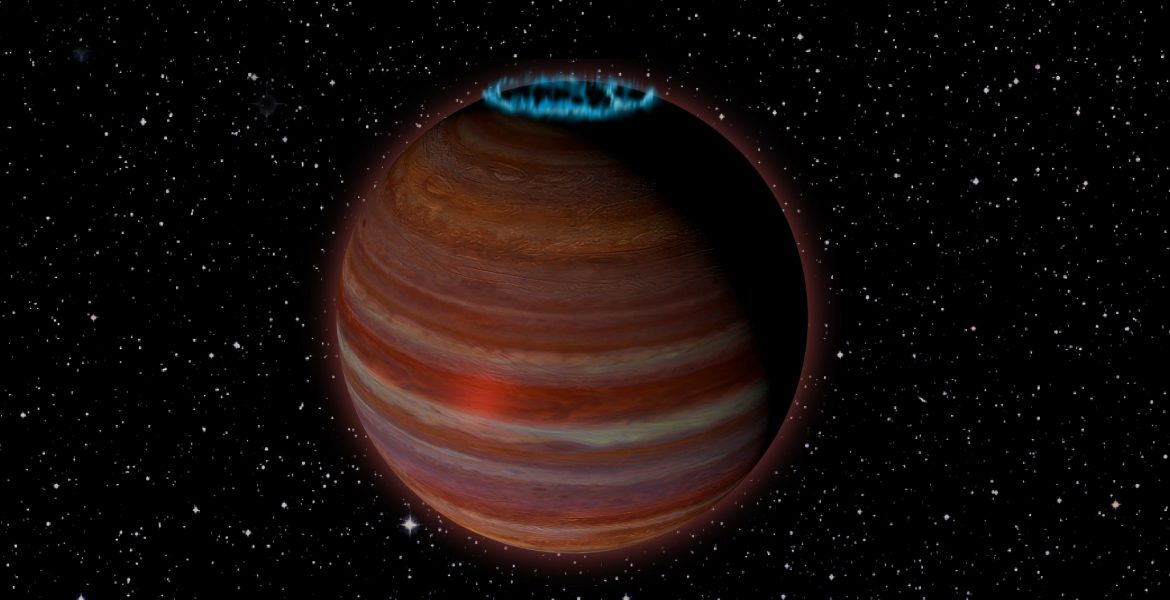
2MASS J0348−6022 is expected to exhibit radio aurorae, similar those depicted in this artist's impression of the radio-emitting T dwarf SIMP J013656.5+093347

The spectral lines in 2MASS J0348−6022's spectrum are Doppler-broadened due to the brown dwarf's rapid rotation, consistent with its short photometric periodicity. This rotational broadening can be modelled as a function of the brown dwarf's projected rotational velocity (v sin i), which is estimated at 103.5 ± 7.4 km/s (64.3 ± 4.6 mi/s).

The rotational velocity at 2MASS J0348−6022's equator (v) is separately calculated from its radius and rotation period, giving 105+18
−12 km/s. While it has the highest reported v sin i value of all known ultra-cool dwarfs, its equatorial rotational velocity only comes second after the slightly larger L8 dwarf 2MASS J1219+3128. The high equatorial rotational velocity of 2MASS J0348−6022 decreases the surface gravity at its equator due to centrifugal acceleration, though this has a negligible effect on the validity of the nominal surface gravity log g = 5.1±0.3 dex inferred from photospheric modelling.

The centrifugal forces exerted by its rapid rotation also cause the brown dwarf to become oblate, being slightly flattened at its poles. Tannock and collaborators calculate an oblateness of 0.08; the difference between the brown dwarf's polar and equatorial radii is 8%. For comparison, the Solar System's most oblate planet Saturn has an oblateness of 0.10. 2MASS J0348−6022 is expected to exhibit significant linear polarization in its optical and infrared thermal emission due to its oblate, dusty atmosphere induced by its rapid rotation and lower surface gravity.

Extrapolations for the breakup periods of typical brown dwarfs older than 1 billion years range tens of minutes depending on mass and radius. The high spin rate and oblateness of 2MASS J0348−6022 places it at about 45% of its rotational stability limit, assuming a smoothly varying fluid interior. Taking into account of magnetic dynamos generated by the brown dwarf's metallic hydrogen interior, the rotational velocity threshold may be even lower and implies that 2MASS J0348−6022 may be closer to breakup than predicted. As brown dwarfs cool and age, they contract in size and spin faster to conserve angular momentum; theoretically rapid rotators like 2MASS J0348−6022 should eventually approach their rotational stability limit and break apart, but no such phenomena have been observed as of 2021. It is possible that some unknown rotational braking mechanism may be preventing brown dwarfs from breaking up as they age.

The rapid rotation of 2MASS J0348−6022 may enhance its magnetic field through a dynamo process involving convection induced by differential rotation in its interior. This in turn enables strong aurorae in the form of circularly polarized radio wave emissions via charged particle interactions in its magnetic field, which are driven by the so-called electron cyclotron maser instability that has been observed in other known rapidly-rotating and radio-emitting brown dwarfs. The inclination of 2MASS J0348−6022's spin axis to Earth is 81°+9°
−27°, derived from its v sin i value. This places it in a nearly equator-on configuration viewed from Earth, which makes it a favorable target for observing these hypothesized auroral radio emissions.

== See also ==
The other two discoveries of rapidly-rotating brown dwarfs, presented in Tannock et al. (2021):

- 2MASS J04070752+1546457 – L3.5 spectral class brown dwarf with a period of 1.23±0.01 h
- 2MASS J12195156+3128497 – L8 spectral class brown dwarf with a period of 1.14+0.03
  −0.01 h
