= 2MASS J04070752+1546457 =

Brown dwarf in the constellation Taurus

Observation data Epoch J2000 Equinox J2000
- Constellation: Taurus
- Right ascension: 04^{h} 07^{m} 07.525^{s}
- Declination: +15° 46′ 45.53″

Characteristics
- Spectral type: L3.5
- Apparent magnitude (G): 20.631±0.011
- Apparent magnitude (J): 15.478±0.058
- Apparent magnitude (H): 14.354±0.057
- Apparent magnitude (K): 13.559±0.038

Astrometry
Radial velocity (R_{v})	43.4±2.1 km/s
Proper motion (μ)	RA: +63.170±1.780 mas/yr Dec.: −52.458±1.246 mas/yr
Parallax (π)	28.2801±1.4093 mas
Distance	115 ± 6 ly (35 ± 2 pc)

Details
Mass	0.064+0.009 −0.027 M_{☉}
Radius	0.100+0.024 −0.008 R_{☉}
Surface gravity (log g)	5.2±0.4 cgs
Temperature	1,840±210 K
Rotation	1.23±0.01 h
Rotational velocity (v sin i)	82.6±0.2 km/s
Age	0.8+11.2 −0.65 Gyr

Other designations
- EPIC 210522262, TIC 348661774, SDSS J040707.56+154645.2

Database references
SIMBAD	data

2MASS J04070752+1546457 (abbreviated to 2MASS J0407+1546) is a rapidly-rotating brown dwarf of spectral class L3.5, located in the constellation Taurus about 119 light-years from Earth. With a photometrically measured rotation period of 1.23 hours, it is one of the fastest-rotating known brown dwarfs announced by a team of astronomers led by Megan E. Tannock in March 2021. With a rotational velocity of over 80 km/s (50 mi/s), it is approaching the predicted rotational speed limit beyond which it would break apart due to centripetal forces. As a consequence of its rapid rotation, the brown dwarf is slightly flattened at its poles to a similar degree as Saturn, the most oblate planet in the Solar System. Its rapid rotation may enable strong auroral radio emissions via particle interactions in its magnetic field, as observed in other known rapidly-rotating brown dwarfs.

== Discovery ==
2MASS J0407+1546 was first catalogued as a point source in June 2003 by the Two Micron All-Sky Survey (2MASS) organized by the University of Massachusetts Amherst and the Infrared Processing and Analysis Center under the California Institute of Technology. It was discovered to be a brown dwarf of the spectral class L3.5 by I. Neill Reid and collaborators, based on near-infrared spectra obtained in October 2005 with the Gemini North at the Mauna Kea Observatory, Hawaii. Their discovery and spectroscopic characterization of 430 ultracool dwarfs including 2MASS J0407+1546 was published in The Astronomical Journal in September 2008.

== Distance ==
The trigonometric parallax of 2MASS 1114−2618 was measured to be 27.4408±1.7735 milliarcseconds by the Gaia spacecraft in 2018, corresponding to a distance of 36.4 ± 2.4 parsecs (118.7 ± 7.8 ly). This is in close agreement with Reid et al.'s spectrophotometric estimate of 33.1 ± 3.3 parsecs (108 ± 11 ly) in 2008, calculated from the object's spectral type and near-infrared absolute magnitude.

== Proper motion ==
From Gaia DR2, 2MASS J0407+1546 has a measured net proper motion of 81.0 mas/yr with position angle 139.06 degrees, (Note: The net proper motion is given by: $\mu = \sqrt{ {\mu_\delta}^2 + {\mu_\alpha}^2 \cdot \cos^2 \delta } \approx 81.0$ mas/yr, where $\mu_\alpha$ and $\mu_\delta$ are the components of proper motion in the RA and Dec, respectively.) (Note: The position angle of proper motion is given by $\tan^{-1} \left (\frac{\mu_{\delta}}{\mu_{\alpha}} \right )$) indicating motion in south-east direction on the sky.

== See also ==
- 2MASS J12195156+3128497 – L8 spectral class brown dwarf with a period of 1.14+0.03
  −0.01 h
- 2MASS J03480772−6022270 – T7 spectral class brown dwarf with a period of 1.080+0.004
  −0.005 h
