= 2MASS J12195156+3128497 =

Brown dwarf in the constellation Coma Berenices

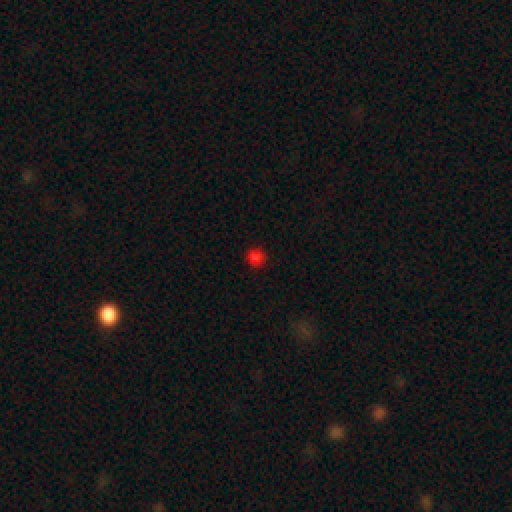
- 2MASS J1219+3128; Credit: legacy surveys

Observation data Epoch J2000 Equinox ICRS
- Constellation: Coma Berenices
- Right ascension: 12^{h} 19^{m} 51.561^{s}
- Declination: +31° 28′ 49.71″

Characteristics
- Spectral type: L8
- Apparent magnitude (J): 15.913±0.082
- Apparent magnitude (H): 14.907±0.074
- Apparent magnitude (K): 14.305±0.072

Astrometry
Radial velocity (R_{v})	−19.0±4.2 km/s
Proper motion (μ)	RA: −233.0±23.7 mas/yr Dec.: −49.6±14.7 mas/yr
Distance	66.2±9.8 ly (20.3±3.0 pc)

Details
Mass	0.047+0.022 −0.025 M_{☉}
Radius	0.100+0.027 −0.013 R_{☉}
Surface gravity (log g)	5.1±0.5 cgs
Temperature	1,330±140 K
Rotation	1.14+0.03 −0.01 h
Rotational velocity (v sin i)	79.0±3.4 km/s
Age	0.9+12.8 −0.8 Gyr

Other designations
- WISE J121951.32+312849.5, UGCS J121951.36+312849.4, SDSS J121951.45+312849.4, TIC 139087399

Database references
SIMBAD	data

2MASS J12195156+3128497 (abbreviated to 2MASS J1219+3128) is a rapidly-rotating brown dwarf of spectral class L8, located in the constellation Coma Berenices about 66 light-years from Earth. With a photometrically measured rotation period of 1.14 hours, it is one of the fastest-rotating known brown dwarfs announced by a team of astronomers led by Megan E. Tannock in March 2021. With a rotational velocity of about 80 km/s (50 mi/s), it is approaching the predicted rotational speed limit beyond which it would break apart due to centripetal forces. As a consequence of its rapid rotation, the brown dwarf is slightly flattened at its poles to a similar degree as Saturn, the most oblate planet in the Solar System. Its rapid rotation may enable strong auroral radio emissions via particle interactions in its magnetic field, as observed in other known rapidly-rotating brown dwarfs.

== Discovery ==
2MASS J1219+3128 was first catalogued as a point source in June 2003 by the Two Micron All-Sky Survey (2MASS) organized by the University of Massachusetts Amherst and the Infrared Processing and Analysis Center under the California Institute of Technology. It was discovered to be a brown dwarf of the spectral class L8 by K. Chiu and collaborators, based on near-infrared observations obtained from the Sloan Digital Sky Survey (SDSS) at Apache Point Observatory in New Mexico, United States. Their discovery and classification of 71 L and T dwarfs including 2MASS J1219+3128 (designated alternatively as SDSS J121951.45+312849.4) was published in The Astronomical Journal in June 2006.

== Distance ==
The distance of 2MASS J1219+3128 from Earth has not yet been measured with trigonometric parallax, so instead it is calculated from the spectrophotometric relation of spectral type and near-infrared absolute magnitude. Schmidt et al. (2010) estimate a spectrophotometric distance of 18.1 ± 3.7 parsecs (59 ± 12 ly) from combined SDSS iz-band and 2MASS JHK-band photometry whereas Buenzli et al. (2014) estimate a spectrophotometric distance of 20.3 ± 3.0 parsecs (66.2 ± 9.8 ly) from 2MASS H-band photometry.

== Proper motion ==
2MASS J1219+3128 has a net proper motion of 238.2 mas/yr with position angle 257.98 degrees, (Note: The net proper motion is given by: $\mu = \sqrt{ {\mu_\delta}^2 + {\mu_\alpha}^2 \cdot \cos^2 \delta } \approx 238.2$ mas/yr, where $\mu_\alpha$ and $\mu_\delta$ are the components of proper motion in the RA and Dec, respectively.) (Note: The position angle of proper motion is given by $\tan^{-1} \left (\frac{\mu_{\delta}}{\mu_{\alpha}} \right )$) indicating motion in south-west direction on the sky.

== See also ==
The other two discoveries of rapidly-rotating brown dwarfs, presented in Tannock et al. (2021):

- 2MASS J04070752+1546457 – L3.5 spectral class brown dwarf with a period of 1.23±0.01 h
- 2MASS J03480772−6022270 – T7 spectral class brown dwarf with a period of 1.080+0.004
  −0.005 h
