= Centripetal (disambiguation) =

Centripetal usually refers to centripetal force, a force that keeps a body on a curved path.

Centripetal may also refer to:

- Centripetal acceleration
- Centripetal Catmull–Rom spline (computer graphics)
- Centripetal harmony
- Centripetal obesity
- Centripetal Spring Armchair
- Centripetal structure (theoretical linguistics) – see Lucien Tesnière

== See also ==
- Centrifugal (disambiguation)
- History of centrifugal and centripetal forces
