= Centrifugal =

Centrifugal (a key concept in rotating systems) may refer to:

- Centrifugal casting (industrial), Centrifugal casting (silversmithing), and Spin casting (centrifugal rubber mold casting), forms of centrifigual casting
- Centrifugal clutch
- Centrifugal compressor
- Centrifugal evaporator
- Centrifugal extractor
- Centrifugal fan
- Centrifugal force
- Centrifugal force (rotating reference frame)
- Centrifugal governor
- Centrifugal gun
- Centrifugal micro-fluidic biochip
- Centrifugal pump
- Centrifugal railway
- Centrifugal switch
- Centrifugal-type supercharger
- Centrifugal water–oil separator
- Centrifugation
- Reactive centrifugal force

== See also ==
- Centrifuge
- Fictitious force
- History of centrifugal and centripetal forces
- Centrifugal Funk, a 1991 album by the Mark Varney Project
- Centrifugal structure, a concept in theoretical linguistics – see Lucien Tesnière
- Centripetal (disambiguation)
- Centrifugal speciation - a variant model of allopatric speciation
