= Period of rotation =

Period of Rotation mey refer to:

- Rotation period (astronomy)
- Rotational frequency
