= Angular frequency =

Rate of change of angle

- Angular speed ω is greater than rotational frequency ν by a factor of 2π.
- Other names: angular speed, angular rate
- Common symbols: ω
- SI unit: radian per second (rad/s)
- Other units: degrees per second (°/s)
- In SI base units: s^{−1}
- Derivations from other quantities: ω = 2πrad⋅ν, ω = dθ/dt
- Dimension: $\mathsf{T}^{-1}$

A sphere rotating around an axis. Points farther from the axis move faster, satisfying ω = v / r.

In physics, angular frequency (symbol ω), also called angular speed and angular rate, is a scalar measure of the angle rate (the angle per unit time) or the temporal rate of change of the phase argument of a sinusoidal waveform or sine function (for example, in oscillations and waves). Angular frequency (or angular speed) is the magnitude of the pseudovector quantity angular velocity.

Angular frequency can be obtained by multiplying rotational frequency, ν (or ordinary frequency, f) by a full turn (2π radians): ω = 2π rad⋅ν. It can also be formulated as ω = dθ/dt, the instantaneous rate of change of the angular displacement, θ, with respect to time, t.

== Unit ==
In SI units, angular frequency is normally presented in the unit radian per second. The unit hertz (Hz) is dimensionally equivalent, but by convention it is only used for frequency f, never for angular frequency ω. This convention is used to help avoid the confusion that arises when dealing with quantities such as frequency and angular quantities because the units of measure (such as cycle or radian) are considered to be one and hence may be omitted when expressing quantities in terms of SI units.

In digital signal processing, the frequency may be normalized by the sampling rate, yielding the normalized frequency.

== Examples ==
=== Circular motion ===
In a rotating or orbiting object, there is a relation between distance from the axis $r$, tangential speed $v$, and the angular frequency of the rotation. During one period, $T$, a body in circular motion travels a distance $vT$. This distance is also equal to the circumference of the path traced out by the body, $2\pi r$. Setting these two quantities equal, and recalling the link between period and angular frequency we obtain: $\omega = v/r.$ Circular motion on the unit circle is given by
$$\omega = \frac{2 \pi}{T} = {2 \pi f} ,$$
where:

- ω is the angular frequency (SI unit: radians per second),
- T is the period (SI unit: seconds),
- f is the ordinary frequency (SI unit: hertz).

=== Oscillations of a spring ===
An object attached to a spring can oscillate. If the spring is assumed to be ideal and massless with no damping, then the motion is simple and harmonic with an angular frequency given by
$$\omega = \sqrt{\frac{k}{m}},$$
where

- k is the spring constant,
- m is the mass of the object.

ω is referred to as the natural angular frequency (sometimes denoted as ω_{0}).

As the object oscillates, its acceleration can be calculated by
$$a = -\omega^2 x,$$
where x is displacement from an equilibrium position.

Using standard frequency f, this equation would be
$$a = -(2 \pi f)^2 x.$$

=== LC circuits ===
The resonant angular frequency in a series LC circuit equals the square root of the reciprocal of the product of the capacitance (C, with SI unit farad) and the inductance of the circuit (L, with SI unit henry):
$$\omega = \sqrt{\frac{1}{LC}}.$$

Adding series resistance (for example, due to the resistance of the wire in a coil) does not change the resonant frequency of the series LC circuit. For a parallel tuned circuit, the above equation is often a useful approximation, but the resonant frequency does depend on the losses of parallel elements.

== Terminology ==
Although angular frequency is often loosely referred to as frequency, it differs from frequency by a factor of 2π, which potentially leads confusion when the distinction is not made clear.

== See also ==
- Cycle per second
- Radian per second
- Degree (angle)
- Mean motion
- Rotational frequency
- Simple harmonic motion

== References and notes ==
Related Reading:

- Olenick, Richard P.; Apostol, Tom M.; Goodstein, David L. (2007). The Mechanical Universe. New York City: Cambridge University Press. pp. 383–385, 391–395. ISBN 978-0-521-71592-8.

Linear/translational quantities				Angular/rotational quantities			
Dimensions	1	L	L^{2}	Dimensions	1	θ	θ^{2}
T	time: t s	absement: A m s		T	time: t s		
1		distance: d, position: r, s, x, displacement: d m	area: A m^{2}	1		angle: θ, angular displacement: θ rad	solid angle: Ω rad^{2}, sr
T^{−1}	frequency: f s^{−1}, Hz	speed: v, velocity: v m s^{−1}	kinematic viscosity: ν, specific angular momentum: h m^{2} s^{−1}	T^{−1}	frequency: f, rotational speed: n, rotational velocity: n s^{−1}, Hz	angular speed: ω, angular velocity: ω rad s^{−1}	
T^{−2}		acceleration: a m s^{−2}		T^{−2}	rotational acceleration s^{−2}	angular acceleration: α rad s^{−2}	
T^{−3}		jerk: j m s^{−3}		T^{−3}		angular jerk: ζ rad s^{−3}	
M	mass: m kg	weighted position: M ⟨x⟩ = ∑ m x	moment of inertia: I kg m^{2}	ML			
MT^{−1}	Mass flow rate: $\dot{m}$ kg s^{−1}	momentum: p, impulse: J kg m s^{−1}, N s	action: 𝒮, actergy: ℵ kg m^{2} s^{−1}, J s	MLT^{−1}		angular momentum: L, angular impulse: ΔL kg m rad s^{−1}	
MT^{−2}		force: F, weight: F_{g} kg m s^{−2}, N	energy: E, work: W, Lagrangian: L kg m^{2} s^{−2}, J	MLT^{−2}		torque: τ, moment: M kg m rad s^{−2}, N m	
MT^{−3}		yank: Y kg m s^{−3}, N s^{−1}	power: P kg m^{2} s^{−3}, W	MLT^{−3}		rotatum: P kg m rad s^{−3}, N m s^{−1}	
