= Inverse second =

Unit of frequency

inverse second
- Unit system: SI
- Unit of: frequency
- Symbol: s^{−1}

Conversions
1 s^{−1} in ...	... is equal to ...
- SI units: 1 Hz

The inverse second or reciprocal second (s^{−1}), also called per second, is a unit defined as the multiplicative inverse of the second (a unit of time). It is applicable for physical quantities of dimension reciprocal time, such as frequency and strain rate.

It is dimensionally equivalent to:

- hertz (Hz), historically known as cycles per second – the SI unit for frequency and rotational frequency
- becquerel (Bq) – the SI unit for the rate of occurrence of aperiodic or stochastic radionuclide events
- baud (Bd) – the unit for symbol rate over a communication link
- bit per second (bit/s) – the unit of bit rate
- radian per second (rad⋅s^{−1}) - the SI unit for angular frequency and angular velocity

However, the special names and symbols above for s^{−1} are recommend to be used in their domains of application, for clarity, as they are used for different kinds of quantity. (Note: "The SI unit of frequency is given as the hertz, implying the unit cycles per second; the SI unit of angular velocity is given as the radian per second; and the SI unit of activity is designated the becquerel, implying the unit counts per second. Although it would be formally correct to write all three of these units as the reciprocal second, the use of the different names emphasises the different nature of the quantities concerned.") (Note: "(d) The hertz is used only for periodic phenomena, and the becquerel (Bq) is used only for stochastic processes in activity referred to a radionuclide.")

The inverse minute or reciprocal minute (min^{−1}), also called per minute, is 60^{−1} s^{−1}, as 1 min = 60 s; it is used in quantities of type "counts per minute", such as:

- Actions per minute
- Beats per minute
- Counts per minute
- Revolutions per minute (rpm)
- Words per minute

Inverse square second (s^{−2}) is involved in the units of linear acceleration, angular acceleration, and rotational acceleration.

== See also ==
- Aperiodic frequency
- Inverse metre
- Reciprocal length
- Shear rate
- Unit of time
