= Hertz =

SI unit of frequency

hertz
- Top to bottom: Lights flashing at frequencies f = 0.5 Hz, 1.0 Hz and 2.0 Hz; that is, at 0.5, 1.0 and 2.0 flashes per second, respectively. The time between each flash – the period T – is given by 1/f (the reciprocal of f ); that is, 2, 1 and 0.5 seconds, respectively.

General information
- Unit system: SI
- Unit of: frequency
- Symbol: Hz
- Named after: Heinrich Hertz
- In SI base units: s^{−1}

The hertz (symbol: Hz) is the unit of frequency in the International System of Units (SI), often described as being equivalent to one event (or cycle) per second. (Note: Although hertz is often said to imply cycle per second (cps), the SI explicitly states that "cycle" and "cps" are not units in the SI, likely due to ambiguity in the terms.) The hertz is an SI derived unit whose formal expression in terms of SI base units is 1/s or s^{−1}, meaning that one hertz is one per second or the reciprocal of one second. It is used only in the case of periodic events. It is named after Heinrich Rudolf Hertz (1857–1894), the first person to provide conclusive proof of the existence of electromagnetic waves. For high frequencies, the unit is commonly expressed in multiples: kilohertz (kHz), megahertz (MHz), gigahertz (GHz), terahertz (THz).

Some of the unit's most common uses are in the description of periodic waveforms and musical tones, particularly those used in radio- and audio-related applications. It is also used to describe the clock speeds at which computers and other electronics are driven. The units are sometimes also used as a representation of the energy of a photon, via the Planck relation E = hν, where E is the photon's energy, ν is its frequency, and h is the Planck constant.

== Definition ==
The hertz is defined as one per second for periodic events. The International Committee for Weights and Measures defined the second as "the duration of 9192631770 periods of the radiation corresponding to the transition between the two hyperfine levels of the ground state of the caesium-133 atom" and then adds: "It follows that the hyperfine splitting in the ground state of the caesium 133 atom is exactly 9192631770 hertz, ν_{hfs Cs} = 9192631770 Hz." The dimension of the unit hertz is 1/time (T^{−1}). Expressed in base SI units, the unit is the reciprocal second (1/s).

In English, "hertz" is also used as the plural form. As an SI unit, Hz can be prefixed; commonly used multiples are kHz (kilohertz, 10^{3} Hz), MHz (megahertz, 10^{6} Hz), GHz (gigahertz, 10^{9} Hz) and THz (terahertz, 10^{12} Hz). One hertz (i.e. one per second) simply means "one periodic event occurs per second" (where the event being counted may be a complete cycle); 100 Hz means "one hundred periodic events occur per second", and so on. The unit may be applied to any periodic event—for example, a clock might be said to tick at 1 Hz, or a human heart might be said to beat at 1.2 Hz.

The occurrence rate of aperiodic or stochastic events is expressed in reciprocal second or inverse second (1/s or s^{−1}) in general or, in the specific case of radioactivity, in becquerels. (Note: "(d) The hertz is used only for periodic phenomena, and the becquerel (Bq) is used only for stochastic processes in activity referred to a radionuclide.") Whereas 1 Hz (one per second) specifically refers to one cycle (or periodic event) per second, 1 Bq (also one per second) specifically refers to one radionuclide event per second on average.

Even though frequency, angular velocity, angular frequency and radioactivity all have the dimension T^{−1}, of these only frequency is expressed using the unit hertz. Thus a disc rotating at 60 revolutions per minute (rpm) is said to have an angular velocity of 2π rad/s and a frequency of rotation of 1 Hz. The correspondence between a frequency f with the unit hertz and an angular velocity ω with the unit radians per second is

$\omega = 2\pi f$ and $f = \frac{\omega}{2\pi} .$

The hertz is named after Heinrich Hertz. As with every SI unit named after a person, its symbol starts with an upper case letter (Hz), but when written in full, it follows the rules for capitalisation of a common noun; i.e., hertz becomes capitalised at the beginning of a sentence and in titles but is otherwise in lower case.

== History ==
The hertz is named after the German physicist Heinrich Hertz (1857–1894), who made important scientific contributions to the study of electromagnetism. The name was established by the International Electrotechnical Commission (IEC) in 1935. It was adopted by the General Conference on Weights and Measures (CGPM) (Conférence générale des poids et mesures) in 1960, replacing the previous name for the unit, "cycles per second" (cps), along with its related multiples, primarily "kilocycles per second" (kc/s) and "megacycles per second" (Mc/s), and occasionally "kilomegacycles per second" (kMc/s). In some circumstances, "megacycles" was used a contraction of "megacycles per second".

Replacement of "cycles per second" by "hertz" in the popular press began in the late 1960s.

== Applications ==
A sine wave with varying frequency

A heartbeat is an example of a non-sinusoidal periodic phenomenon that may be analyzed in terms of frequency. Two cycles are illustrated.

=== Sound and vibration ===
Sound is a traveling longitudinal wave, which is an oscillation of pressure. Humans perceive the frequency of a sound as its pitch. Each musical note corresponds to a particular frequency. An infant's ear is able to perceive frequencies ranging from 20 Hz to 20000 Hz; the average adult human can hear sounds between 20 Hz and 16000 Hz. The range of ultrasound, infrasound and other physical vibrations such as molecular and atomic vibrations extends from a few femtohertz into the terahertz range (Note: Atomic vibrations are typically on the order of tens of terahertz) and beyond.

=== Electromagnetic radiation ===
Electromagnetic radiation is often described by its frequency—the number of oscillations of the perpendicular electric and magnetic fields per second—expressed in hertz.

Radio frequency radiation is usually measured in kilohertz (kHz), megahertz (MHz), or gigahertz (GHz), with the latter known as microwaves. Light is electromagnetic radiation that is even higher in frequency, and has frequencies in the range of tens of terahertz (THz)—infrared—to a few petahertz (PHz) — ultraviolet. The visible spectrum is around 400–790 THz. Electromagnetic radiation with frequencies in the low terahertz range (intermediate between those of the highest normally usable radio frequencies and long-wave infrared light) is often called terahertz radiation. Higher frequencies, such as those of X-rays and gamma rays, can be described in exahertz (EHz).

For historical and practical reasons, electromagnetic radiation from infrared and above is commonly specified in terms of its wavelength in nm; X-rays and above by their photon energies in eV (keV to GeV and above). For a more detailed treatment of these frequency ranges, see Electromagnetic spectrum.

=== Gravitational waves ===
Observations of gravitational waves are conducted in the 30–7000 Hz range by laser interferometers like LIGO, and the nanohertz (1–1000 nHz) range by pulsar timing arrays. Future space-based detectors are planned to fill in the gap, with LISA operating from 0.1 to 10 mHz (with some sensitivity from 10 μHz to 100 mHz), and DECIGO in the 0.1–10 Hz range.

=== Computers ===
In computers, most central processing units (CPU) are labeled in terms of their clock rate expressed in megahertz (MHz) or gigahertz (GHz). This specification refers to the frequency of the CPU's master clock signal. This signal is nominally a square wave, which is an electrical voltage that switches between low and high logic levels at regular intervals. As the hertz has become the primary unit of measurement accepted by the general populace to determine the performance of a CPU, many experts have criticized this approach, which they claim is an easily manipulable benchmark. Some processors use multiple clock cycles to perform a single operation, while others can perform multiple operations in a single cycle. For personal computers, CPU clock speeds have ranged from approximately 1 MHz in the late 1970s (Atari, Commodore, Apple computers) to up to 6 GHz in IBM Power microprocessors.

Various computer buses, such as the front-side bus connecting the CPU and northbridge, also operate at various frequencies in the megahertz range.

== SI multiples ==
SI multiples of hertz (Hz)
Submultiples			Multiples		
Value	SI symbol	Name	Value	SI symbol	Name
10^{−1} Hz	dHz	decihertz	10^{1} Hz	daHz	decahertz
10^{−2} Hz	cHz	centihertz	10^{2} Hz	hHz	hectohertz
10^{−3} Hz	mHz	millihertz	10^{3} Hz	**kHz**	**kilohertz**
10^{−6} Hz	μHz	microhertz	10^{6} Hz	**MHz**	**megahertz**
10^{−9} Hz	nHz	nanohertz	10^{9} Hz	**GHz**	**gigahertz**
10^{−12} Hz	pHz	picohertz	10^{12} Hz	**THz**	**terahertz**
10^{−15} Hz	fHz	femtohertz	10^{15} Hz	PHz	petahertz
10^{−18} Hz	aHz	attohertz	10^{18} Hz	EHz	exahertz
10^{−21} Hz	zHz	zeptohertz	10^{21} Hz	ZHz	zettahertz
10^{−24} Hz	yHz	yoctohertz	10^{24} Hz	YHz	yottahertz
10^{−27} Hz	rHz	rontohertz	10^{27} Hz	RHz	ronnahertz
10^{−30} Hz	qHz	quectohertz	10^{30} Hz	QHz	quettahertz
Common prefixed units are in bold.

Higher frequencies than the International System of Units provides prefixes for are believed to occur naturally in the frequencies of the quantum-mechanical vibrations of massive particles, although these are not directly observable and must be inferred through other phenomena. By convention, these are typically not expressed in hertz, but in terms of the equivalent energy, which is proportional to the frequency by the factor of the Planck constant.

== Unicode ==
The CJK Compatibility block in Unicode contains characters for common SI units for frequency. These are intended for compatibility with East Asian character encodings, and not for use in new documents (which would be expected to use Latin letters, e.g. "MHz").

- U+3339 ㌹ SQUARE HERUTU (ヘルツ, herutsu)
- U+3390 ㎐ SQUARE HZ (Hz)
- U+3391 ㎑ SQUARE KHZ (kHz)
- U+3392 ㎒ SQUARE MHZ (MHz)
- U+3393 ㎓ SQUARE GHZ (GHz)
- U+3394 ㎔ SQUARE THZ (THz)

== See also ==
- Alternating current
- Bandwidth (signal processing)
- Electronic tuner
- FLOPS
- Frequency changer
- Normalized frequency (signal processing)
- Orders of magnitude (frequency)
- Orders of magnitude (rotational speed)
- Periodic function
- Radian per second
- Rate
- Sampling rate
