= Revolutions per minute =

Unit of rotational speed

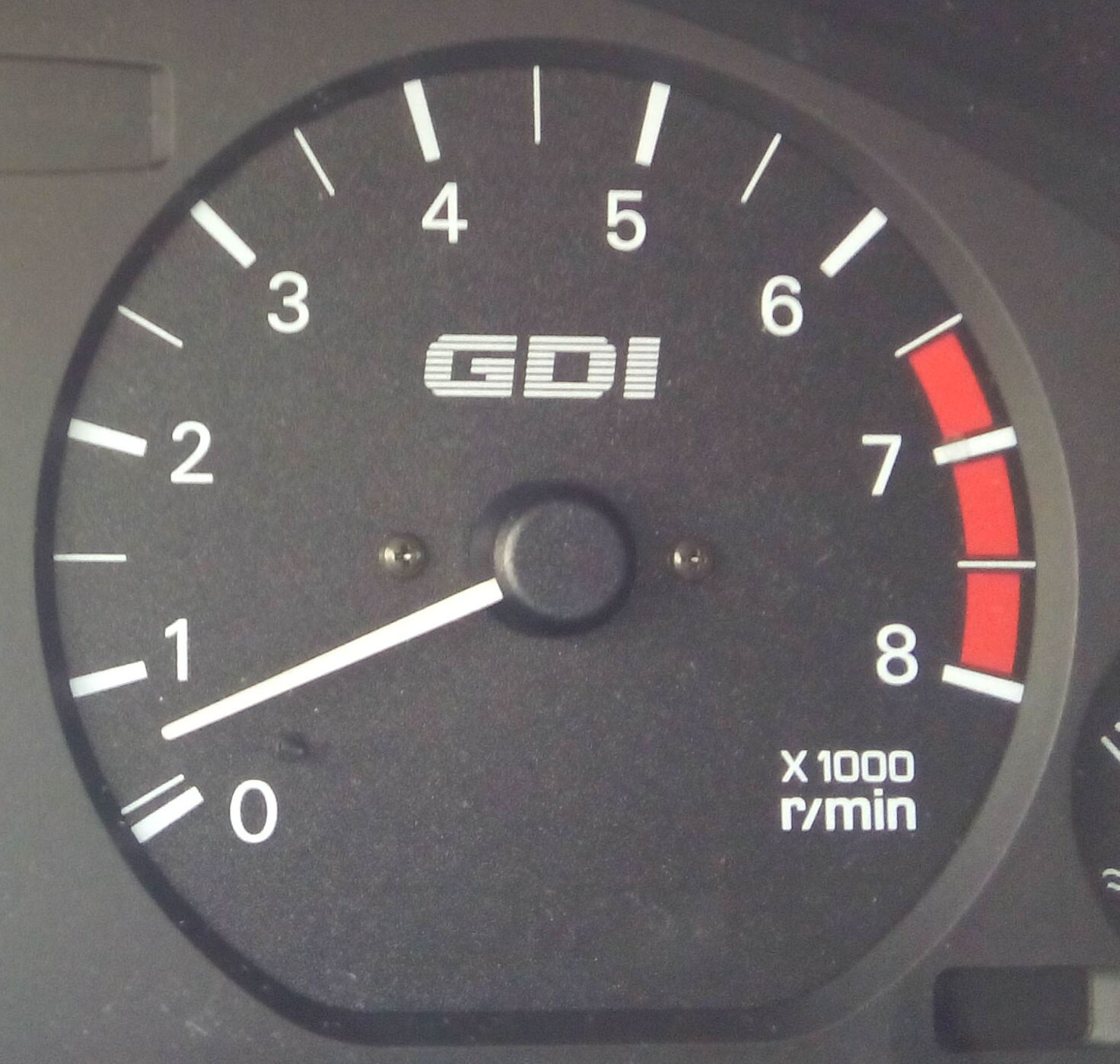
- A car's tachometer marked in multiples of a thousand rpm

General information
- Unit of: Rotational speed, rotational frequency
- Symbol: rpm, r/min

Conversions
1 rpm in ...	... is equal to ...
- SI accepted units: 1 min^{−1}
- SI units: 1/60 Hz = 0.016̅ Hz
- SI base units: 0.016̅ s^{−1}

Revolutions per minute (abbreviated rpm, RPM, rev/min, r/min, or r⋅min^{−1}) is a unit of rotational speed (or rotational frequency) for rotating machines. One revolution per minute is equivalent to 1/60 hertz.

== Standards ==
ISO 80000-3:2019 defines a physical quantity called rotation (or number of revolutions), dimensionless, whose instantaneous rate of change is called rotational frequency (or rate of rotation), with units of reciprocal seconds (s^{−1}).

A related but distinct quantity for describing rotation is angular frequency (or angular speed, the magnitude of angular velocity), for which the SI unit is the radian per second (rad/s).

Although they have the same dimensions (reciprocal time) and base unit (s^{−1}), the hertz (Hz) and radians per second (rad/s) are special names used to express two different but proportional ISQ quantities: frequency and angular frequency, respectively. The conversions between a frequency f and an angular frequency ω are
$$\omega = 2 \pi f, \quad f = \frac{\omega}{2 \pi}.$$

Thus a disc rotating at 60 rpm is said to have an angular speed of 2π rad/s and a rotation frequency of 1 Hz.

The International System of Units (SI) does not recognize rpm as a unit. It defines units of angular frequency and angular velocity as rad s^{−1}, and units of frequency as Hz, both of which are equal to s^{−1}.

== Examples ==
- For a wheel, a pump, or a crank shaft, the number of times that it completes one full cycle in one minute is given the unit revolution per minute. A revolution is one complete period of motion, whether this be circular, reciprocating or some other periodic motion.
- On many kinds of disc recording media, the rotational speed of the medium under the read head is a standard given in rpm. Phonograph (gramophone) records, for example, typically rotate steadily at 16 2/3, 33 1/3, 45 rpm or 78 rpm (0.28, 0.55, 0.75, or 1.3, respectively, in Hz).
- Air turbine rotating up to 1500000 rpm (25 kHz)
- Modern air turbine dental drills can rotate at over 800000 rpm (13.3 kHz).
- The second hand of a conventional analog clock rotates at 1 rpm.
- Audio CD players read their discs at a precise, constant rate (4.3218 Mbit/s of raw physical data for 1.4112 Mbit/s (176.4 KB/s) of usable audio data) and thus must vary the disc's rotational speed from 8 Hz (480 rpm) when reading at the innermost edge to 3.5 Hz (210 rpm) at the outer edge.
- DVD players also usually read discs at a constant linear rate. The disc's rotational speed varies from 25.5 Hz (1530 rpm) when reading at the innermost edge, to 10.5 Hz (630 rpm) at the outer edge.
- A washing machine's drum may rotate at 500 rpm to 2763 rpm (8 Hz – 46 Hz) during the spin cycles.
- A baseball thrown by a Major League Baseball pitcher can rotate at over 2500 rpm (41.7 Hz); faster rotation yields more movement on breaking balls.
- A power-generation turbine (with a two-pole alternator) rotates at 3000 rpm (50 Hz), 3600 rpm (60 Hz), and over 4000 rpm (66 2/3 Hz)
- Modern automobile engines are typically operated around 1600 rpm – 2800 rpm (31 Hz – 48 Hz) when cruising, with a minimum (idle) speed around 750 rpm – 900 rpm (12.5 Hz – 15 Hz), and an upper limit anywhere from 4800 rpm to up to 9500 rpm (80 Hz – 158 Hz) for a road car, very rarely reaching up to 10000 rpm for certain cars (such as the GMA T.50), or 22000 rpm for racing engines such as those in Formula 1 cars (during the 2006 season, with the 2.4 L N/A V8 engine configuration; limited to 15000 rpm, with the 1.6 L V6 turbo-hybrid engine configuration). The exhaust note of V8, V10, and V12 F1 cars has a much higher pitch than an I4 engine, because each of the cylinders of a four-stroke engine fires once for every two revolutions of the crankshaft. Thus an eight-cylinder engine turning 300 times per second will have an exhaust note of 1200 Hz.
- Large two-stroke slow speed diesel engines are often used as ship engines. Most of them operate below 120 rpm, and some very long stroke engines have a maximum speed of around 80 rpm.
- A piston aircraft engine typically rotates at a rate between 2500 rpm and 10000 rpm (42 Hz – 166 Hz).
- Computer hard drives typically rotate at 7500 rpm – 10000 rpm (125 Hz – 166 Hz), the most common speeds for the ATA or SATA-based drives in consumer models. High-performance drives (used in fileservers and enthusiast-gaming PCs) rotate at 10000 rpm – 15000 rpm (160 Hz – 250 Hz), usually with higher-level SATA, SCSI or Fibre Channel interfaces and smaller platters to allow these higher speeds, the reduction in storage capacity and ultimate outer-edge speed paying off in much quicker access time and average transfer speed thanks to the high spin rate. Until recently, lower-end and power-efficient laptop drives could be found with 4200 rpm or even 3600 rpm spindle speeds (70 Hz or 60 Hz), but these have fallen out of favour due to their lower performance, improvements in energy efficiency in faster models and the takeup of solid-state drives for use in slimline and ultraportable laptops. Similar to CD and DVD media, the amount of data that can be stored or read for each turn of the disc is greater at the outer edge than near the spindle; however, hard drives keep a constant rotational speed so the effective data rate is faster at the edge (conventionally, the "start" of the disc, opposite to a CD or DVD).
- Optical disc drives typically ran at a constant 300 rpm or occasionally 360 rpm (a relatively slow 5 Hz or 6 Hz) with a constant per-revolution data density, which was simple and inexpensive to implement, though inefficient. Some designs such as those used with older Apple computers (Lisa, early Macintosh, later II's) were more complex and used variable rotational speeds and per-track storage density (at a constant read/record rate) to store more data per disc; for example, between 394 rpm (with 12 sectors per track) and 590 rpm (8 sectors) with Mac's 800 kB double-density drive at a constant 39.4 kB/s (max) – versus 300 rpm, 720 kB and 23 kB/s (max) for double-density drives in other machines.
- A Zippe-type centrifuge for enriching uranium spins at 100000 rpm (1666 Hz) or faster.
- Gas turbine engines rotate at tens of thousands of rpm. JetCat model aircraft turbines are capable of over 100000 rpm (1700 Hz) with the fastest reaching 165780 rpm (2763 Hz).
- A flywheel energy storage system works at 60000 rpm – 500000 rpm (1 kHz – 8.3 kHz) range using a passively magnetic levitated flywheel in a vacuum. The choice of the flywheel material is not the most dense, but the one that pulverises the most safely, at surface speeds about 7 times the speed of sound.
- A typical 80 mm, 30 CFM computer fan will spin at 2600 rpm – 3000 rpm (43 Hz – 50 Hz) on 12 V DC power.
- A millisecond pulsar can have near 50000 rpm (833 Hz).
- A turbocharger can reach 1000000 rpm (16.6 kHz), while 100000 rpm – 250000 rpm (1 kHz – 3 kHz) is common.
- A supercharger can spin at speeds between or as high as 50000 rpm – 100000 rpm (833 Hz – 1666 Hz)
- Molecular microbiology – molecular engines. The rotation rates of bacterial flagella have been measured to be 10200 rpm (170 Hz) for Salmonella typhimurium, 16200 rpm (270 Hz) for Escherichia coli, and up to 500000 rpm (1700 Hz) for polar flagellum of Vibrio alginolyticus, allowing the latter organism to move in simulated natural conditions at a maximum speed of 540 mm/h.
- The sample in magic angle spinning, a nuclear magnetic resonance technique, typically rotates between 300000 and 6000000 rpm (5–100 kHz), with experimental instruments reaching speeds as high as 12000000 rpm (200 kHz).
- Hypothetical spinning dust, nanometer-sized interstellar dust particles, would spin as fast as 3600000000000 rpm (60 GHz).

== See also ==
- Constant angular velocity (CAV) – used when referring to the speed of gramophone (phonograph) records
- Constant linear velocity (CLV) – used when referring to the speed of audio CDs
- Radian per second
- Rotational speed
- Compressor map
- Turn (geometry)
- Idle speed
- Overspeed (engine)
- Redline
- Rev limiter
- Tachometer
