= Cycle per second =

Historical synonym for hertz, the unit of frequency

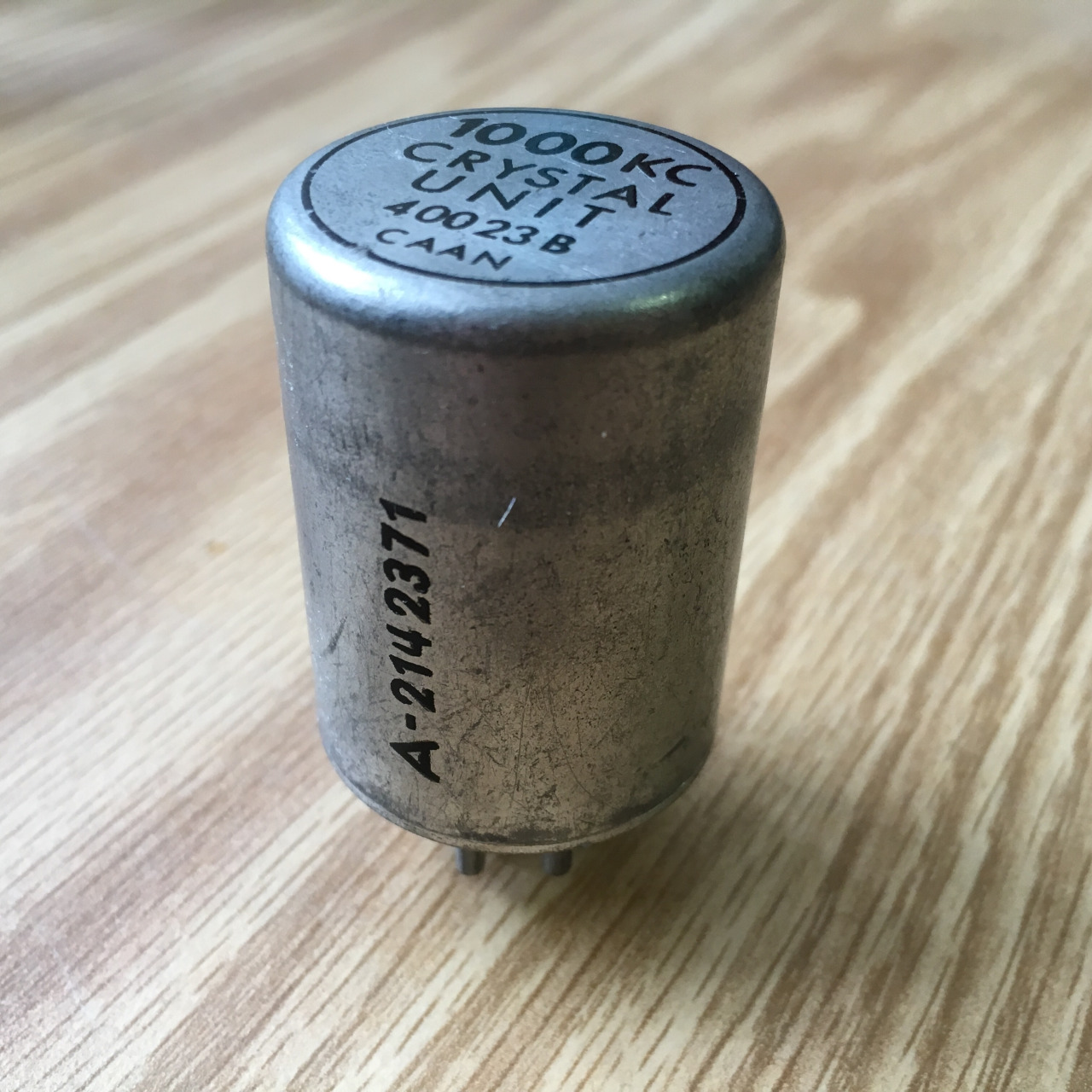
- A 1 MHz military-grade crystal resonator with an octal base, marked "1000 KC" for 1000 kilocycles per second.

General information
- Unit of: Frequency, rotational frequency
- Symbol: cps, c/s

Conversions
1 cps in ...	... is equal to ...
- SI units: 1 Hz = 1 s^{−1}

The cycle per second is a once-common English name for the unit of frequency now known as the hertz (Hz). Cycles per second may be denoted by c.p.s., c/s, or, ambiguously, just "cycles" (Cyc., Cy., C, or c). The term comes from repetitive phenomena such as sound waves having a frequency measurable as a number of oscillations, or cycles, per second.

With the organization of the International System of Units in 1960, the cycle per second was officially replaced by the hertz, or reciprocal second, "s^{−1}" or "1/s". Symbolically, "cycle per second" units are "cycle/second", while hertz is "Hz" or "s^{−1}". For higher frequencies, kilocycles (kc), as an abbreviation of kilocycles per second were often used on components or devices. Other higher units like megacycle (Mc) and less commonly kilomegacycle (kMc) were used before 1960 and in some later documents. These have modern equivalents such as kilohertz (kHz), megahertz (MHz), and gigahertz (GHz). Following the introduction of the SI standard, use of these terms began to fall off in favor of the new unit, with hertz becoming the dominant convention in both academic and colloquial speech by the 1970s.

Cycle can also be a unit for measuring usage of reciprocating machines, especially presses, in which cases cycle refers to one complete revolution of the mechanism being measured (i.e. the shaft of a reciprocating engine).

Derived units include cycles per day (cpd) and cycles per year (cpy).

== See also ==
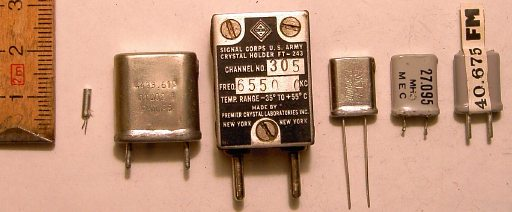
Crystal resonators, the 1940s-era center unit is marked in kc.

- Cycles per instruction (CPI)
- Cycles per metre
- Heinrich Hertz
- Instructions per cycle (IPC)
- Instructions per second (IPS)
- MKS system of units a predecessor of the SI set of units
- Normalized frequency
- Radian per second
- Revolutions per minute (RPM)
- Turn (angle)
