= Normalized frequency (signal processing) =

Frequency divided by a characteristic frequency

In digital signal processing (DSP), a normalized frequency is a ratio of a variable frequency ($f$) and a constant frequency associated with a system (such as a sampling rate, $f_s$). Some software applications require normalized inputs and produce normalized outputs, which can be re-scaled to physical units when necessary. Mathematical derivations are usually done in normalized units, relevant to a wide range of applications.

== Examples of normalization ==
A typical choice of characteristic frequency is the sampling rate ($f_s$) that is used to create the digital signal from a continuous one. The normalized quantity, $f' = \tfrac{f}{f_s},$ has the unit cycle per sample regardless of whether the original signal is a function of time or distance. For example, when $f$ is expressed in Hz (cycles per second), $f_s$ is expressed in samples per second.

Some programs (such as MATLAB toolboxes) that design filters with real-valued coefficients prefer the Nyquist frequency $(f_s/2)$ as the frequency reference, which changes the numeric range that represents frequencies of interest from $\left[0, \tfrac{1}{2}\right]$ cycle/sample to $[0, 1]$ half-cycle/sample. Therefore, the normalized frequency unit is important when converting normalized results into physical units.

Example of plotting samples of a frequency distribution in the unit "bins", which are integer values. A scale factor of 0.7812 converts a bin number into the corresponding physical unit (hertz).

A common practice is to sample the frequency spectrum of the sampled data at frequency intervals of $\tfrac{f_s}{N},$ for some arbitrary integer $N$ (see § Sampling the DTFT). The samples (sometimes called frequency bins) are numbered consecutively, corresponding to a frequency normalization by $\tfrac{f_s}{N}.$ The normalized Nyquist frequency is $\tfrac{N}{2}$ with the unit 1/N^{th} cycle/sample.

Angular frequency, denoted by $\omega$ and with the unit radians per second, can be similarly normalized. When $\omega$ is normalized with reference to the sampling rate as $\omega' = \tfrac{\omega}{f_s},$ the normalized Nyquist angular frequency is π radians/sample.

The following table shows examples of normalized frequency for $f = 1$ kHz, $f_s = 44100$ samples/second (often denoted by 44.1 kHz), and 4 normalization conventions:

Quantity	Numeric range	Calculation	Reverse
$f' = \tfrac{f}{f_s}$	[0, 1/2] cycle/sample	1000 / 44100 = 0.02268	$f = f' \cdot f_s$
$f' = \tfrac{f}{f_s / 2}$	[0, 1] half-cycle/sample	1000 / 22050 = 0.04535	$f = f' \cdot \tfrac{f_s}{2}$
$f' = \tfrac{f}{f_s / N}$	[0, N/2] bins	1000 × N / 44100 = 0.02268 N	$f = f ' \cdot \tfrac{f_s}{N}$
$\omega' = \tfrac{\omega}{f_s}$	[0, π] radians/sample	1000 × 2π / 44100 = 0.14250	$\omega = \omega' \cdot f_s$

== See also ==
- Prototype filter
