= Tangential speed =

How quickly an object undergoes movement in a circular path

Tangential speed (v) and angular speed (ω) on a spinning disc of radius r.

Tangential speed is the speed of an object undergoing circular motion, i.e., moving along a circular path. A point on the outside edge of a merry-go-round or turntable travels a greater distance in one complete rotation than a point nearer the center. Travelling a greater distance in the same time means a greater speed, and so linear speed is greater on the outer edge of a rotating object than it is closer to the axis. This speed along a circular path is known as tangential speed because the direction of motion is tangent to the circumference of the circle. For circular motion, the terms linear speed and tangential speed are used interchangeably, and is measured in SI units as meters per second (m/s).

== Formula ==
Rotational speed (or rotational frequency) measures the number of revolutions per unit of time. All parts of a rigid merry-go-round or turntable turn about the axis of rotation in the same amount of time. Thus, all parts share the same rate of rotation, or the same number of rotations or revolutions per unit of time. When a direction is assigned to rotational speed, it is known as rotational velocity, a vector whose magnitude is the rotational speed. (Angular speed and angular velocity are related to the rotational speed and velocity by a factor of 2π, the number of radians turned in a full rotation.)

Tangential speed and rotational speed are related: the faster an object rotates around an axis, the larger the speed. Tangential speed is directly proportional to rotational speed at any fixed distance from the axis. However, tangential speed, unlike rotational speed, depends on radial distance (the distance from the axis). For a platform rotating with a fixed rotational speed, the tangential speed in the centre is zero. Towards the edge of the platform the tangential speed increases proportional to the distance from the axis. In equation form:
$$v \propto \!\, r \omega\,,$$

where v is tangential speed and ω (Greek letter omega) is rotational speed. One moves faster if the rate of rotation increases (a larger value for ω), and one also moves faster if movement farther from the axis occurs (a larger value for r). Move twice as far from the rotational axis at the centre and you move twice as fast. Move out three times as far, and you have three times as much tangential speed. In any kind of rotating system, tangential speed depends on how far you are from the axis of rotation.

When proper units are used for tangential speed v, rotational speed ω, and radial distance r, the direct proportion of v to both r and ω becomes the exact equation
$$v = r\omega\,.$$
This comes from the following: the linear (tangential) velocity of an object in rotation is the rate at which it covers the circumference's length:

$$v = \frac{2\pi r}{T}$$

The angular velocity $\omega$ is defined as $2\pi /T$, where T is the rotation period, hence $v = \omega r$.

Thus, tangential speed will be directly proportional to r when all parts of a system simultaneously have the same ω, as for a wheel, disk, or rigid wand.

Tangential velocity vector (rapidity or speed is his norm or module) is the vector product:
$$\vec{v} = \vec{\omega} \times \vec{r}=||\vec{\omega}||||\vec{r}||\sin(|\Delta \theta|)\cdot\hat{u}_n =\vec{v}=\dot{\vec{r}}= {d\vec{r} \over dt}$$
Because of the right hand rule linear tangential velocity vector points tangential to the rotation.

Where $\vec{\omega}={d \beta \over dt} \hat{u}_\beta$ is the angular velocity (angular frequency) vector normal to the plane of rotation of the body, where $\beta$ is the angle (scalar in radians) of the rotational movement (similar to r that is the norm (scalar) of the translational movement position vector), measured in rad./s = 1/s because rad. radians are adimensional.

$\vec{r}$ is the position vector (equivalent to radius) to the rotating puntual particle or distributed continuous body or where is measured the tangential velocity in a body, measured in meters m.

$\hat{u}_n$ is the normal (to the plane of $\vec{\omega}$ and $\vec{r}$) unit vector.

$\theta$ are the angles of the vectors $\vec{\omega}$ and $\vec{r}$ in their common plane where they are, form or describe.

Rapidity or speed $v$ is the norm or module of velocity vector $\vec{v}$:

$v=||\vec{v}|| = ||\vec{\omega} \times \vec{r}|| = ||\vec{\omega}||||\vec{r}|| \sin(|\Delta \theta|)=v$

$v=||\vec{v}|| = ||\vec{\omega} \times \vec{r}|| = ||\vec{\omega}||||\vec{r}||=\omega r=v$

Only if: $\sin(|\Delta \theta|)=1$, when: $|\Delta \theta|=|\theta_\vec{r}-\theta_\vec{\omega}| = {\pi \over 2}=90^o$, when: $\vec{\omega} \perp \vec{r}$ which means that angular velocity vector is orthogonal (perpendicular) to the position vector.

${d \vec{ r_{(t)} } \over dt } = \vec{\omega_{(t)}} \times \vec{r_{(t)}}$

${d^2 \vec{ r_{(t)} } \over dt^2 } = \vec{\alpha_{(t)}} \times \vec{r_{(t)}}$

${d \vec{ r_{(t)} } \over dt } = \dot{\vec{r}}_{(t)} = \vec{V}_{(t)} =[{m \over s}]$

${d^2 \vec{ r_{(t)} } \over dt^2 } = \ddot{\vec{r}}_{(t)} = \vec{a}_{(t)} =[{m \over s^2}]$

Tangential acceleration $\vec{a}$ is:

$\vec{a}=\vec{\omega}\times ( \vec{\omega } \times \vec{r})=\ddot{\vec{r}}$ , $=[{m \over {s^2}}]$

which means that is from an centripetal force that is then the fictitious force, not the fictitious centrifugal force in its opposite direction

Linear/translational quantities				Angular/rotational quantities			
Dimensions	1	L	L^{2}	Dimensions	1	θ	θ^{2}
T	time: t s	absement: A m s		T	time: t s		
1		distance: d, position: r, s, x, displacement: d m	area: A m^{2}	1		angle: θ, angular displacement: θ rad	solid angle: Ω rad^{2}, sr
T^{−1}	frequency: f s^{−1}, Hz	speed: v, velocity: v m s^{−1}	kinematic viscosity: ν, specific angular momentum: h m^{2} s^{−1}	T^{−1}	frequency: f, rotational speed: n, rotational velocity: n s^{−1}, Hz	angular speed: ω, angular velocity: ω rad s^{−1}	
T^{−2}		acceleration: a m s^{−2}		T^{−2}	rotational acceleration s^{−2}	angular acceleration: α rad s^{−2}	
T^{−3}		jerk: j m s^{−3}		T^{−3}		angular jerk: ζ rad s^{−3}	
M	mass: m kg	weighted position: M ⟨x⟩ = ∑ m x	moment of inertia: I kg m^{2}	ML			
MT^{−1}	Mass flow rate: $\dot{m}$ kg s^{−1}	momentum: p, impulse: J kg m s^{−1}, N s	action: 𝒮, actergy: ℵ kg m^{2} s^{−1}, J s	MLT^{−1}		angular momentum: L, angular impulse: ΔL kg m rad s^{−1}	
MT^{−2}		force: F, weight: F_{g} kg m s^{−2}, N	energy: E, work: W, Lagrangian: L kg m^{2} s^{−2}, J	MLT^{−2}		torque: τ, moment: M kg m rad s^{−2}, N m	
MT^{−3}		yank: Y kg m s^{−3}, N s^{−1}	power: P kg m^{2} s^{−3}, W	MLT^{−3}		rotatum: P kg m rad s^{−3}, N m s^{−1}	
