= History of centrifugal and centripetal forces =

In physics, the history of centrifugal and centripetal forces illustrates a long and complex evolution of thought about the nature of forces, relativity, and the nature of physical laws.

== Huygens, Leibniz, Newton, and Hooke ==
Early scientific ideas about centrifugal force were based upon intuitive perception, and circular motion was considered somehow more "natural" than straight-line motion. According to Domenico Bertoloni-Meli:

For Huygens and Newton centrifugal force was the result of a curvilinear motion of a body; hence it was located in nature, in the object of investigation. According to a more recent formulation of classical mechanics, centrifugal force depends on the choice of how phenomena can be conveniently represented. Hence it is not located in nature, but is the result of a choice by the observer. In the first case a mathematical formulation mirrors centrifugal force; in the second it creates it.

Christiaan Huygens coined the term "centrifugal force" in his 1659 De Vi Centrifuga and wrote of it in his 1673 Horologium Oscillatorium on pendulums. In 1676–77, Isaac Newton combined Kepler's laws of planetary motion with Huygens' ideas, refined them, and found

the proposition that by a centrifugal force reciprocally as the square of the distance a planet must revolve in an ellipsis about the center of the force placed in the lower umbilicus of the ellipsis, and with a radius drawn to that center, describe areas proportional to the times.

Newton coined the term "centripetal force" (vis centripeta) in his discussions of gravity in his De motu corporum in gyrum, a 1684 manuscript which he sent to Edmond Halley.

Gottfried Leibniz as part of his "solar vortex theory" conceived of centrifugal force as a real outward force which is induced by the circulation of the body upon which the force acts. An inverse cube law centrifugal force appears in an equation representing planetary orbits, including non-circular ones, as Leibniz described in his 1689 Tentamen de motuum coelestium causis. Leibniz's equation is still used today to solve planetary orbital problems, although his solar vortex theory is no longer used as its basis.

Leibniz produced an equation for planetary orbits in which the centrifugal force appeared as an outward inverse cube law force in the radial direction:

$$\ddot r = -k/r^{2} + l^{2}/r^{3}$$.

Newton himself appears to have previously supported an approach similar to that of Leibniz. Later, Newton in his Principia crucially limited the description of the dynamics of planetary motion to a frame of reference in which the point of attraction is fixed. In this description, Leibniz's centrifugal force was not needed and was replaced by only continually inward forces toward the fixed point. Newton objected to Leibniz's equation on the grounds that it allowed for the centrifugal force to have a different value from the centripetal force, arguing on the basis of his third law of motion, that the centrifugal force and the centripetal force must constitute an equal and opposite action-reaction pair. In this however, Newton was mistaken, as the reactive centrifugal force which is required by the third law of motion is a completely separate concept from the centrifugal force of Leibniz's equation.

Huygens, who was, along with Leibniz, a neo-Cartesian and critic of Newton, concluded after a long correspondence that Leibniz's writings on celestial mechanics made no sense, and that his invocation of a harmonic vortex was logically redundant, because Leibniz's radial equation of motion follows trivially from Newton's laws. Even the most ardent modern defenders of the cogency of Leibniz's ideas acknowledge that his harmonic vortex as the basis of centrifugal force was dynamically superfluous.

Newton described the role of centrifugal force upon the height of the oceans near the equator in the Principia:

Since the centrifugal force of the parts of the earth, arising from the earth's diurnal motion, which is to the force of gravity as 1 to 289, raises the waters under the equator to a height exceeding that under the poles by 85472 Paris feet, as above, in Prop. XIX., the force of the sun, which we have now shewed to be to the force of gravity as 1 to 12868200, and therefore is to that centrifugal force as 289 to 12868200, or as 1 to 44527, will be able to raise the waters in the places directly under and directly opposed to the sun to a height exceeding that in the places which are 90 degrees removed from the sun only by one Paris foot and 113 V inches; for this measure is to the measure of 85472 feet as 1 to 44527.

— Newton: Principia Corollary to Book II, Proposition XXXVI. Problem XVII

The effect of centrifugal force in countering gravity, as in this behavior of the tides, has led centrifugal force sometimes to be called "false gravity" or "imitation gravity" or "quasi-gravity".

== Eighteenth century ==
It wasn't until the latter half of the 18th century that the modern "fictitious force" understanding of the centrifugal force as a pseudo-force artifact of rotating reference frames took shape. In a 1746 memoir by Daniel Bernoulli, "the idea that the centrifugal force is fictitious emerges unmistakably." Bernoulli, in seeking to describe the motion of an object relative to an arbitrary point, showed that the magnitude of the centrifugal force depended on which arbitrary point was chosen to measure circular motion about. Later in the 18th century Joseph Louis Lagrange in his Mécanique Analytique explicitly stated that the centrifugal force depends on the rotation of a system of perpendicular axes. In 1835, Gaspard-Gustave Coriolis analyzed arbitrary motion in rotating systems, specifically in relation to waterwheels. He coined the phrase "compound centrifugal force" for a term which bore a similar mathematical expression to that of centrifugal force, albeit that it was multiplied by a factor of two. The force in question was perpendicular to both the velocity of an object relative to a rotating frame of reference and the axis of rotation of the frame. Compound centrifugal force eventually came to be known as the Coriolis Force.

== Absolute versus relative rotation ==
The idea of centrifugal force is closely related to the notion of absolute rotation. In 1707 the Irish bishop George Berkeley took issue with the notion of absolute space, declaring that "motion cannot be understood except in relation to our or some other body". In considering a solitary globe, all forms of motion, uniform and accelerated, are unobservable in an otherwise empty universe. This notion was followed up in modern times by Ernst Mach. For a single body in an empty universe, motion of any kind is inconceivable. Because rotation does not exist, centrifugal force does not exist. Of course, addition of a speck of matter just to establish a reference frame cannot cause the sudden appearance of centrifugal force, so it must be due to rotation relative to the entire mass of the universe. The modern view is that centrifugal force is indeed an indicator of rotation, but relative to those frames of reference that exhibit the simplest laws of physics. Thus, for example, if we wonder how rapidly our galaxy is rotating, we can make a model of the galaxy in which its rotation plays a part. The rate of rotation in this model that makes the observations of (for example) the flatness of the galaxy agree best with physical laws as we know them is the best estimate of the rate of rotation (assuming other observations are in agreement with this assessment, such as isotropy of the background radiation of the universe).

== Role in developing the idea of inertial frames and relativity ==
In the rotating bucket experiment, Newton observed the shape of the surface of water in a bucket as the bucket was spun on a rope. At first the water is flat, then, as it acquires the same rotation as the bucket, it becomes parabolic. Newton took this change as evidence that one could detect rotation relative to "absolute space" experimentally, in this instance by looking at the shape of the surface of the water.

Later scientists pointed out (as did Newton) that the laws of mechanics were the same for all observers that differed only by uniform translation; that is, all observers that differed in motion only by a constant velocity. Hence, "absolute space" was not preferred, but only one of a set of frames related by Galilean transformations.

By the end of the nineteenth century, some physicists had concluded that the concept of absolute space is not really needed...they used the law of inertia to define the entire class of inertial frames. Purged of the concept of absolute space, Newton's laws do single out the class of inertial frames of reference, but assert their complete equality for the description of all mechanical phenomena.

— Laurie M. Brown, Abraham Pais, A. B. Pippard: Twentieth Century Physics, pp. 256-257

Ultimately this notion of the transformation properties of physical laws between frames played a more and more central role. It was noted that accelerating frames exhibited "fictitious forces" like the centrifugal force. These forces did not behave under transformation like other forces, providing a means of distinguishing them. This peculiarity of these forces led to the names inertial forces, pseudo-forces or fictitious forces. In particular, fictitious forces did not appear at all in some frames: those frames differing from that of the fixed stars by only a constant velocity. In short, a frame tied to the "fixed stars" is merely a member of the class of "inertial frames", and absolute space is an unnecessary and logically untenable concept. The preferred, or "inertial frames", were identifiable by the absence of fictitious forces.

The effect of his being in the noninertial frame is to require the observer to introduce a fictitious force into his calculations….

— Sidney Borowitz and Lawrence A Bornstein in A Contemporary View of Elementary Physics, p. 138

The equations of motion in a non-inertial system differ from the equations in an inertial system by additional terms called inertial forces. This allows us to detect experimentally the non-inertial nature of a system.

— V. I. Arnol'd: Mathematical Methods of Classical Mechanics Second Edition, p. 129

The idea of an inertial frame was extended further in the special theory of relativity. This theory posited that all physical laws should appear of the same form in inertial frames, not just the laws of mechanics. In particular, Maxwell's equations should apply in all frames. Because Maxwell's equations implied the same speed of light in the vacuum of free space for all inertial frames, inertial frames now were found to be related not by Galilean transformations, but by Poincaré transformations, of which a subset is the Lorentz transformations. That posit led to many ramifications, including Lorentz contractions and relativity of simultaneity. Einstein succeeded, through many clever thought experiments, in showing that these apparently odd ramifications in fact had very natural explanation upon looking at just how measurements and clocks actually were used. That is, these ideas flowed from operational definitions of measurement coupled with the experimental confirmation of the constancy of the speed of light.

Later the general theory of relativity further generalized the idea of frame independence of the laws of physics, and abolished the special position of inertial frames, at the cost of introducing curved space-time. Following an analogy with centrifugal force (sometimes called "artificial gravity" or "false gravity"), gravity itself became a fictitious force, as enunciated in the equivalence principle.

The principle of equivalence: There is no experiment observers can perform to distinguish whether an acceleration arises because of a gravitational force or because their reference frame is accelerating

— Douglas C. Giancoli Physics for Scientists and Engineers with Modern Physics, p. 155

In short, centrifugal force played a key early role in establishing the set of inertial frames of reference and the significance of fictitious forces, even aiding in the development of general relativity.

== The modern conception ==
The modern interpretation is that centrifugal force in a rotating reference frame is a pseudo-force that appears in equations of motion in rotating frames of reference, to explain effects of inertia as seen in such frames.

Leibniz's centrifugal force may be understood as an application of this conception, as a result of his viewing the motion of a planet along the radius vector, that is, from the standpoint of a special reference frame rotating with the planet. Leibniz introduced the notions of vis viva (kinetic energy) and action, which eventually found full expression in the Lagrangian formulation of mechanics. In deriving Leibniz's radial equation from the Lagrangian standpoint, a rotating reference frame is not used explicitly, but the result is equivalent to that found using Newtonian vector mechanics in a co-rotating reference frame.
