= Centripetal force =

Force directed to the center of rotation

A particle is disturbed from its uniform linear motion by a series of short kicks (1, 2, ...), giving its trajectory a nearly circular shape. The force is referred to as a centripetal force in the limit of a continuously acting force directed towards the center of curvature of the path.

Centripetal force (from Latin centrum 'center' and petere 'to seek') is the force that makes a body follow a curved path. The direction of the centripetal force is always orthogonal to the motion of the body and towards the fixed point of the instantaneous center of curvature of the path. Isaac Newton coined the term, describing it as "a force by which bodies are drawn or impelled, or in any way tend, towards a point as to a centre". In Newtonian mechanics, gravity provides the centripetal force causing astronomical orbits.

One common example involving centripetal force is the case in which a body moves with uniform speed along a circular path. The centripetal force is directed at right angles to the motion and also along the radius towards the centre of the circular path. The mathematical description was derived in 1659 by the Dutch physicist Christiaan Huygens.

== Formula ==
From the kinematics of curved motion it is known that an object moving at tangential speed v along a path with radius of curvature r accelerates toward the center of curvature at a rate
$$\textbf{a}_c = \lim_{\Delta t \to 0} \frac{\Delta \textbf{v}}{\Delta t}, \quad a_c = \frac{v^2}{r}$$
Here, $a_c$ is the centripetal acceleration and $\Delta \textbf{v}$ is the difference between the velocity vectors at $t+\Delta{t}$ and $t$.

By Newton's second law, the cause of acceleration is a net force acting on the object, which is proportional to its mass m and its acceleration. The force, usually referred to as a centripetal force, has a magnitude
$$F_c = ma_c = m\frac{v^2}{r}$$
and is, like centripetal acceleration, directed toward the center of curvature of the object's trajectory.

=== Derivation ===

The centripetal acceleration can be inferred from the diagram of the velocity vectors at two instances. In the case of uniform circular motion the velocities have constant magnitude. Because each one is perpendicular to its respective position vector, simple vector subtraction implies two similar isosceles triangles with congruent angles – one comprising a base of $\Delta \textbf{v}$ and a leg length of $v$, and the other a base of $\Delta \textbf{r}$ (position vector difference) and a leg length of $r$
$$\frac{|\Delta \textbf{v}|}{v} = \frac{|\Delta \textbf{r}|}{r}$$
$$|\Delta \textbf{v}| = \frac{v}{r}|\Delta \textbf{r}|$$
Therefore, $|\Delta\textbf{v}|$ can be substituted with $\frac{v}{r} |\Delta \textbf{r}|$:
$$a_c = \lim_{\Delta t \to 0} \frac{|\Delta \textbf{v}|}{\Delta t} = \frac{v}{r} \lim_{\Delta t \to 0} \frac{|\Delta \textbf{r}|}{\Delta t} = \frac{v^2}{r}$$
The direction of the force is toward the center of the circle in which the object is moving, or the osculating circle (the circle that best fits the local path of the object, if the path is not circular). The speed in the formula is squared, so twice the speed needs four times the force, at a given radius.

This force is also sometimes written in terms of the angular velocity ω of the object about the center of the circle, related to the tangential velocity by the formula
$$v = \omega r$$
so that
$$F_c = m r \omega^2 \,.$$

Expressed using the orbital period T for one revolution of the circle,
$$\omega = \frac{2\pi}{T}$$
the equation becomes
$$F_c = m r \left(\frac{2\pi}{T}\right)^2.$$

In particle accelerators, velocity can be very high (close to the speed of light in vacuum) so the same rest mass now exerts greater inertia (relativistic mass) thereby requiring greater force for the same centripetal acceleration, so the equation becomes:
$$F_c = \frac{\gamma m v^2}{r}$$
where
$$\gamma = \frac{1}{\sqrt{1-\frac{v^2}{c^2}}}$$
is the Lorentz factor.

Thus the centripetal force is given by:
$$F_c = \gamma m v \omega$$
which is the rate of change of relativistic momentum $\gamma m v$.

== Sources ==
A body experiencing uniform circular motion requires a centripetal force, towards the axis as shown, to maintain its circular path.

In the case of an object that is swinging around on the end of a rope in a horizontal plane, the centripetal force on the object is supplied by the tension of the rope. The rope example is an example involving a 'pull' force. The centripetal force can also be supplied as a 'push' force, such as in the case where the normal reaction of a wall supplies the centripetal force for a wall of death or a Rotor rider.

Newton's idea of a centripetal force corresponds to what is nowadays referred to as a central force. When a satellite is in orbit around a planet, gravity is considered to be a centripetal force even though in the case of eccentric orbits, the gravitational force is directed towards the focus, and not towards the instantaneous center of curvature.

Another example of centripetal force arises in the helix that is traced out when a charged particle moves in a uniform magnetic field in the absence of other external forces. In this case, the magnetic force is the centripetal force that acts towards the helix axis.

== Analysis of several cases ==
Below are three examples of increasing complexity, with derivations of the formulas governing velocity and acceleration.

=== Uniform circular motion ===
Uniform circular motion refers to the case of constant rate of rotation. Here are two approaches to describing this case.

==== Calculus derivation ====
In two dimensions, the position vector $\textbf{r}$, which has magnitude (length) $r$ and directed at an angle $\theta$ above the x-axis, can be expressed in Cartesian coordinates using the unit vectors $\hat\mathbf x$ and $\hat\mathbf y$:
$$\textbf{r} = r \cos(\theta) \hat\mathbf x + r \sin(\theta) \hat\mathbf y.$$

The assumption of uniform circular motion requires three things:

1. The object moves only on a circle.
2. The radius of the circle $r$ does not change in time.
3. The object moves with constant angular velocity $\omega$ around the circle. Therefore, $\theta = \omega t$ where $t$ is time.

The velocity $\textbf{v}$ and acceleration $\textbf{a}$ of the motion are the first and second derivatives of position with respect to time:

$$\textbf{r} = r \cos(\omega t) \hat\mathbf x + r \sin(\omega t) \hat\mathbf y,$$
$$\textbf{v} = \dot{\textbf{r}} = - r \omega \sin(\omega t) \hat\mathbf x + r \omega \cos(\omega t) \hat\mathbf y,$$
$$\textbf{a} = \ddot{\textbf{r}} = - \omega^2 (r \cos(\omega t) \hat\mathbf x + r \sin(\omega t) \hat\mathbf y).$$

The term in parentheses is the original expression of $\textbf{r}$ in Cartesian coordinates. Consequently,
$$\textbf{a} = - \omega^2 \textbf{r}.$$
The negative sign shows that the acceleration is pointed towards the center of the circle (opposite the radius), hence it is called "centripetal" (i.e. "center-seeking"). While objects naturally follow a straight path (due to inertia), this centripetal acceleration describes the circular motion path caused by a centripetal force.

==== Derivation using vectors ====
Vector relationships for uniform circular motion; vector Ω representing the rotation is normal to the plane of the orbit with polarity determined by the right-hand rule and magnitude dθ /dt.

The image at right shows the vector relationships for uniform circular motion. The rotation itself is represented by the angular velocity vector Ω, which is normal to the plane of the orbit (using the right-hand rule) and has magnitude given by:

$$|\mathbf{\Omega}| = \frac {\mathrm{d} \theta } {\mathrm{d}t} = \omega \ ,$$

with θ the angular position at time t. In this subsection, dθ/dt is assumed constant, independent of time. The distance traveled dℓ of the particle in time dt along the circular path is

$$\mathrm{d}\boldsymbol{\ell} = \mathbf {\Omega} \times \mathbf{r}(t) \mathrm{d}t \ ,$$

which, by properties of the vector cross product, has magnitude rdθ and is in the direction tangent to the circular path.

Consequently,

$$\frac {\mathrm{d} \mathbf{r}}{\mathrm{d}t} = \lim_{{\Delta}t \to 0} \frac {\mathbf{r}(t + {\Delta}t)-\mathbf{r}(t)}{{\Delta}t} = \frac{\mathrm{d} \boldsymbol{\ell}}{\mathrm{d}t} \ .$$

In other words,

$$\mathbf{v}\ \stackrel{\mathrm{def}}{ = }\ \frac {\mathrm{d} \mathbf{r}}{\mathrm{d}t} = \frac {\mathrm{d}\mathbf{\boldsymbol{\ell}}}{\mathrm{d}t} = \mathbf {\Omega} \times \mathbf{r}(t)\ .$$

Differentiating with respect to time,
$$\mathbf{a}\ \stackrel{\mathrm{def}}{ = }\ \frac {\mathrm{d} \mathbf{v}} {d\mathrm{t}} = \mathbf {\Omega} \times \frac{\mathrm{d} \mathbf{r}(t)}{\mathrm{d}t} = \mathbf{\Omega} \times \left[ \mathbf {\Omega} \times \mathbf{r}(t)\right] \ .$$

Lagrange's formula states:
$$\mathbf{a} \times \left ( \mathbf{b} \times \mathbf{c} \right ) = \mathbf{b} \left ( \mathbf{a} \cdot \mathbf{c} \right ) - \mathbf{c} \left ( \mathbf{a} \cdot \mathbf{b} \right ) \ .$$

Applying Lagrange's formula with the observation that Ω • r(t) = 0 at all times,
$$\mathbf{a} = - {|\mathbf{\Omega|}}^2 \mathbf{r}(t) \ .$$

In words, the acceleration is pointing directly opposite to the radial displacement r at all times, and has a magnitude:
$$|\mathbf{a}| = |\mathbf{r}(t)| \left ( \frac {\mathrm{d} \theta}{\mathrm{d}t} \right) ^2 = r {\omega}^2$$
where vertical bars |...| denote the vector magnitude, which in the case of r(t) is simply the radius r of the path. This result agrees with the previous section, though the notation is slightly different.

When the rate of rotation is made constant in the analysis of nonuniform circular motion, that analysis agrees with this one.

A merit of the vector approach is that it is manifestly independent of any coordinate system.

==== Example: The banked turn ====
Upper panel: Ball on a banked circular track moving with constant speed v; Lower panel: Forces on the ball

The upper panel in the image at right shows a ball in circular motion on a banked curve. The curve is banked at an angle θ from the horizontal, and the surface of the road is considered to be slippery. The objective is to find what angle the bank must have so the ball does not slide off the road. Intuition tells us that, on a flat curve with no banking at all, the ball will simply slide off the road; while with a very steep banking, the ball will slide to the center unless it travels the curve rapidly.

Apart from any acceleration that might occur in the direction of the path, the lower panel of the image above indicates the forces on the ball. There are two forces; one is the force of gravity vertically downward through the center of mass of the ball mg, where m is the mass of the ball and g is the gravitational acceleration; the second is the upward normal force exerted by the road at a right angle to the road surface ma_{n}. The centripetal force demanded by the curved motion is also shown above. This centripetal force is not a third force applied to the ball, but rather must be provided by the net force on the ball resulting from vector addition of the normal force and the force of gravity. The resultant or net force on the ball found by vector addition of the normal force exerted by the road and vertical force due to gravity must equal the centripetal force dictated by the need to travel a circular path. The curved motion is maintained so long as this net force provides the centripetal force requisite to the motion.

The horizontal net force on the ball is the horizontal component of the force from the road, which has magnitude |F_{h}| = m|a_{n}| sin θ. The vertical component of the force from the road must counteract the gravitational force: |F_{v}| = m|a_{n}| cos θ = m|g|, which implies |a_{n}| = |g| / cos θ. Substituting into the above formula for |F_{h}| yields a horizontal force to be:
$$|\mathbf{F}_\mathrm{h}| = m |\mathbf{g}| \frac { \sin \theta}{ \cos \theta} = m|\mathbf{g}| \tan \theta \, .$$

On the other hand, at velocity |v| on a circular path of radius r, kinematics says that the force needed to turn the ball continuously into the turn is the radially inward centripetal force F_{c} of magnitude:
$$|\mathbf{F}_\mathrm{c}| = m |\mathbf{a}_\mathrm{c}| = \frac{m|\mathbf{v}|^2}{r} \, .$$

Consequently, the ball is in a stable path when the angle of the road is set to satisfy the condition:
$$m |\mathbf{g}| \tan \theta = \frac{m|\mathbf{v}|^2}{r} \, ,$$
or,
$$\tan \theta = \frac {|\mathbf{v}|^2} {|\mathbf{g}|r} \, .$$

As the angle of bank θ approaches 90°, the tangent function approaches infinity, allowing larger values for |v|^{2}/r. In words, this equation states that for greater speeds (bigger |v|) the road must be banked more steeply (a larger value for θ), and for sharper turns (smaller r) the road also must be banked more steeply, which accords with intuition. When the angle θ does not satisfy the above condition, the horizontal component of force exerted by the road does not provide the correct centripetal force, and an additional frictional force tangential to the road surface is called upon to provide the difference. If friction cannot do this (that is, the coefficient of friction is exceeded), the ball slides to a different radius where the balance can be realized.

These ideas apply to air flight as well. See the FAA pilot's manual.

=== Nonuniform circular motion ===
Velocity and acceleration for nonuniform circular motion: the velocity vector is tangential to the orbit, but the acceleration vector is not radially inward because of its tangential component a_{θ} that increases the rate of rotation: dω / dt = | a_{θ}| / R.

As a generalization of the uniform circular motion case, suppose the angular rate of rotation is not constant. The acceleration now has a tangential component, as shown the image at right. This case is used to demonstrate a derivation strategy based on a polar coordinate system.

Let r(t) be a vector that describes the position of a point mass as a function of time. Since we are assuming circular motion, let r(t) = R·u_{r}, where R is a constant (the radius of the circle) and u_{r} is the unit vector pointing from the origin to the point mass. The direction of u_{r} is described by θ, the angle between the x-axis and the unit vector, measured counterclockwise from the x-axis. The other unit vector for polar coordinates, u_{θ} is perpendicular to u_{r} and points in the direction of increasing θ. These polar unit vectors can be expressed in terms of Cartesian unit vectors in the x and y directions, denoted $\hat\mathbf i$ and $\hat\mathbf j$ respectively:
$$\mathbf u_r = \cos \theta \ \hat\mathbf i + \sin \theta \ \hat\mathbf j$$
and
$$\mathbf u_\theta = - \sin \theta \ \hat\mathbf i + \cos \theta \ \hat\mathbf j.$$

One can differentiate to find velocity:
$$\begin{align}
\mathbf{v} &= r \frac {d \mathbf{u}_r}{dt} \\
&= r \frac {d}{dt} \left( \cos \theta \ \hat\mathbf{i} + \sin \theta \ \hat\mathbf{j}\right) \\
&= r \frac {d \theta}{dt} \frac{d}{d \theta} \left( \cos \theta \ \hat\mathbf{i} + \sin \theta \ \hat\mathbf{j}\right) \\
& = r \frac {d \theta} {dt} \left( -\sin \theta \ \hat\mathbf{i} + \cos \theta \ \hat\mathbf{j}\right)\\
& = r \frac{d\theta}{dt} \mathbf{u}_\theta \\
& = \omega r \mathbf{u}_\theta
\end{align}$$
where ω is the angular velocity dθ/dt.

This result for the velocity matches expectations that the velocity should be directed tangentially to the circle, and that the magnitude of the velocity should be rω. Differentiating again, and noting that
$$\frac {d\mathbf{u}_\theta}{dt} = -\frac{d\theta}{dt} \mathbf{u}_r = - \omega \mathbf{u}_r \ ,$$
we find that the acceleration, a is:
$$\mathbf{a} = r \left( \frac {d\omega}{dt} \mathbf{u}_\theta - \omega^2 \mathbf{u}_r \right) \ .$$

Thus, the radial and tangential components of the acceleration are:
$$\mathbf{a}_{r} = - \omega^{2} r \ \mathbf{u}_r = - \frac{|\mathbf{v}|^2}{r} \ \mathbf{u}_r$$
and
$$\mathbf{a}_\theta = r \ \frac {d\omega}{dt} \ \mathbf{u}_\theta = \frac {d | \mathbf{v} | }{dt} \ \mathbf{u}_\theta \ ,$$
where |v| = r ω is the magnitude of the velocity (the speed).

These equations express mathematically that, in the case of an object that moves along a circular path with a changing speed, the acceleration of the body may be decomposed into a perpendicular component that changes the direction of motion (the centripetal acceleration), and a parallel, or tangential component, that changes the speed.

=== General planar motion ===
Position vector r, always points radially from the origin.

Velocity vector v, always tangent to the path of motion.

Acceleration vector a, not parallel to the radial motion but offset by the angular and Coriolis accelerations, nor tangent to the path but offset by the centripetal and radial accelerations.

Kinematic vectors in plane polar coordinates. Notice the setup is not restricted to 2d space, but a plane in any higher dimension.

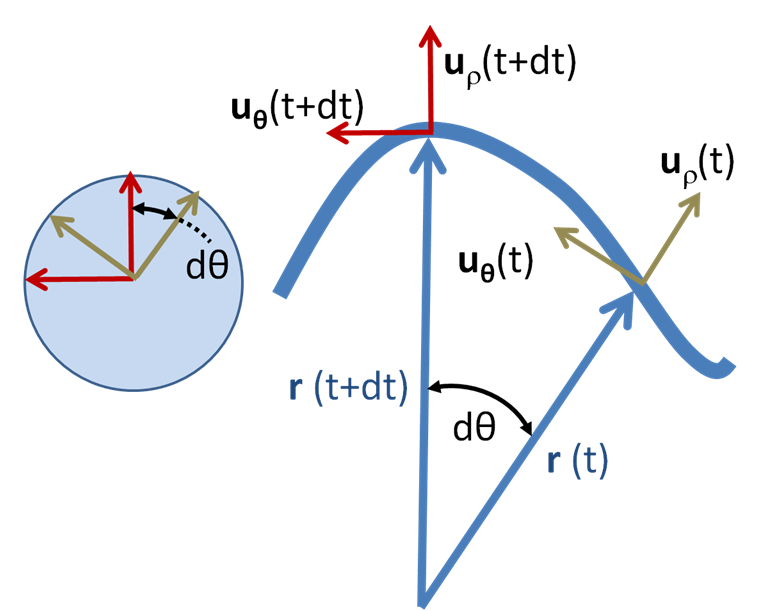
Polar unit vectors at two times t and t + dt for a particle with trajectory r ( t ); on the left the unit vectors u_{ρ} and u_{θ} at the two times are moved so their tails all meet, and are shown to trace an arc of a unit radius circle. Their rotation in time dt is dθ, just the same angle as the rotation of the trajectory r ( t ).

==== Polar coordinates ====
The above results can be derived perhaps more simply in polar coordinates, and at the same time extended to general motion within a plane, as shown next. Polar coordinates in the plane employ a radial unit vector u_{ρ} and an angular unit vector u_{θ}, as shown above. A particle at position r is described by:

$$\mathbf{r} = \rho \mathbf{u}_{\rho} \ ,$$

where the notation ρ is used to describe the distance of the path from the origin instead of R to emphasize that this distance is not fixed, but varies with time. The unit vector u_{ρ} travels with the particle and always points in the same direction as r(t). Unit vector u_{θ} also travels with the particle and stays orthogonal to u_{ρ}. Thus, u_{ρ} and u_{θ} form a local Cartesian coordinate system attached to the particle, and tied to the path travelled by the particle. By moving the unit vectors so their tails coincide, as seen in the circle at the left of the image above, it is seen that u_{ρ} and u_{θ} form a right-angled pair with tips on the unit circle that trace back and forth on the perimeter of this circle with the same angle θ(t) as r(t).

When the particle moves, its velocity is

$$\mathbf{v} = \frac {\mathrm{d} \rho }{\mathrm{d}t} \mathbf{u}_{\rho} + \rho \frac {\mathrm{d} \mathbf{u}_{\rho}}{\mathrm{d}t} \, .$$

To evaluate the velocity, the derivative of the unit vector u_{ρ} is needed. Because u_{ρ} is a unit vector, its magnitude is fixed, and it can change only in direction, that is, its change du_{ρ} has a component only perpendicular to u_{ρ}. When the trajectory r(t) rotates an amount dθ, u_{ρ}, which points in the same direction as r(t), also rotates by dθ. See image above. Therefore, the change in u_{ρ} is

$$\mathrm{d} \mathbf{u}_{\rho} = \mathbf{u}_{\theta} \mathrm{d}\theta \, ,$$

or

$$\frac {\mathrm{d} \mathbf{u}_{\rho}}{\mathrm{d}t} = \mathbf{u}_{\theta} \frac {\mathrm{d}\theta}{\mathrm{d}t} \, .$$

In a similar fashion, the rate of change of u_{θ} is found. As with u_{ρ}, u_{θ} is a unit vector and can only rotate without changing size. To remain orthogonal to u_{ρ} while the trajectory r(t) rotates an amount dθ, u_{θ}, which is orthogonal to r(t), also rotates by dθ. See image above. Therefore, the change du_{θ} is orthogonal to u_{θ} and proportional to dθ (see image above):

$$\frac{\mathrm{d} \mathbf{u}_{\theta}}{\mathrm{d}t} = -\frac {\mathrm{d} \theta} {\mathrm{d}t} \mathbf{u}_{\rho} \, .$$

The equation above shows the sign to be negative: to maintain orthogonality, if du_{ρ} is positive with dθ, then du_{θ} must decrease.

Substituting the derivative of u_{ρ} into the expression for velocity:

$$\mathbf{v} = \frac {\mathrm{d} \rho }{\mathrm{d}t} \mathbf{u}_{\rho} + \rho \mathbf{u}_{\theta} \frac {\mathrm{d} \theta} {\mathrm{d}t} = v_{\rho} \mathbf{u}_{\rho} + v_{\theta} \mathbf{u}_{\theta} = \mathbf{v}_{\rho} + \mathbf{v}_{\theta} \, .$$

To obtain the acceleration, another time differentiation is done:

$$\mathbf{a} = \frac {\mathrm{d}^2 \rho }{\mathrm{d}t^2} \mathbf{u}_{\rho} + \frac {\mathrm{d} \rho }{\mathrm{d}t} \frac{\mathrm{d} \mathbf{u}_{\rho}}{\mathrm{d}t} + \frac {\mathrm{d} \rho}{\mathrm{d}t} \mathbf{u}_{\theta} \frac {\mathrm{d} \theta} {\mathrm{d}t} + \rho \frac{\mathrm{d} \mathbf{u}_{\theta}}{\mathrm{d}t} \frac {\mathrm{d} \theta} {\mathrm{d}t} + \rho \mathbf{u}_{\theta} \frac {\mathrm{d}^2 \theta} {\mathrm{d}t^2} \, .$$

Substituting the derivatives of u_{ρ} and u_{θ}, the acceleration of the particle is:

$$\begin{align}
\mathbf{a} & = \frac {\mathrm{d}^2 \rho }{\mathrm{d}t^2} \mathbf{u}_{\rho} + 2\frac {\mathrm{d} \rho}{\mathrm{d}t} \mathbf{u}_{\theta} \frac {\mathrm{d} \theta} {\mathrm{d}t} - \rho \mathbf{u}_{\rho} \left( \frac {\mathrm{d} \theta} {\mathrm{d}t}\right)^2 + \rho \mathbf{u}_{\theta} \frac {\mathrm{d}^2 \theta} {\mathrm{d}t^2} \ , \\
& = \mathbf{u}_{\rho} \left[ \frac {\mathrm{d}^2 \rho }{\mathrm{d}t^2}-\rho\left( \frac {\mathrm{d} \theta} {\mathrm{d}t}\right)^2 \right] + \mathbf{u}_{\theta}\left[ 2\frac {\mathrm{d} \rho}{\mathrm{d}t} \frac {\mathrm{d} \theta} {\mathrm{d}t} + \rho \frac {\mathrm{d}^2 \theta} {\mathrm{d}t^2}\right] \\
& = \mathbf{u}_{\rho} \left[ \frac {\mathrm{d}v_{\rho}}{\mathrm{d}t}-\frac{v_{\theta}^2}{\rho}\right] + \mathbf{u}_{\theta}\left[ \frac{2}{\rho}v_{\rho} v_{\theta} + \rho\frac{\mathrm{d}}{\mathrm{d}t}\frac{v_{\theta}}{\rho}\right] \, .
\end{align}$$

As a particular example, if the particle moves in a circle of constant radius R, then dρ/dt = 0, v = v_{θ}, and:

$$\mathbf{a} = \mathbf{u}_{\rho} \left[ -\rho\left( \frac {\mathrm{d} \theta} {\mathrm{d}t}\right)^2 \right] + \mathbf{u}_{\theta}\left[ \rho \frac {\mathrm{d}^2 \theta} {\mathrm{d}t^2}\right] = \mathbf{u}_{\rho} \left[ -\frac{v^2}{r}\right] + \mathbf{u}_{\theta}\left[ \frac {\mathrm{d} v} {\mathrm{d}t}\right] \$$

where $v = v_{\theta}.$

These results agree with those above for nonuniform circular motion. See also the article on non-uniform circular motion. If this acceleration is multiplied by the particle mass, the leading term is the centripetal force and the negative of the second term related to angular acceleration is sometimes called the Euler force.

For trajectories other than circular motion, for example, the more general trajectory envisioned in the image above, the instantaneous center of rotation and radius of curvature of the trajectory are related only indirectly to the coordinate system defined by u_{ρ} and u_{θ} and to the length |r(t)| = ρ. Consequently, in the general case, it is not straightforward to disentangle the centripetal and Euler terms from the above general acceleration equation. To deal directly with this issue, local coordinates are preferable, as discussed next.

==== Local coordinates ====
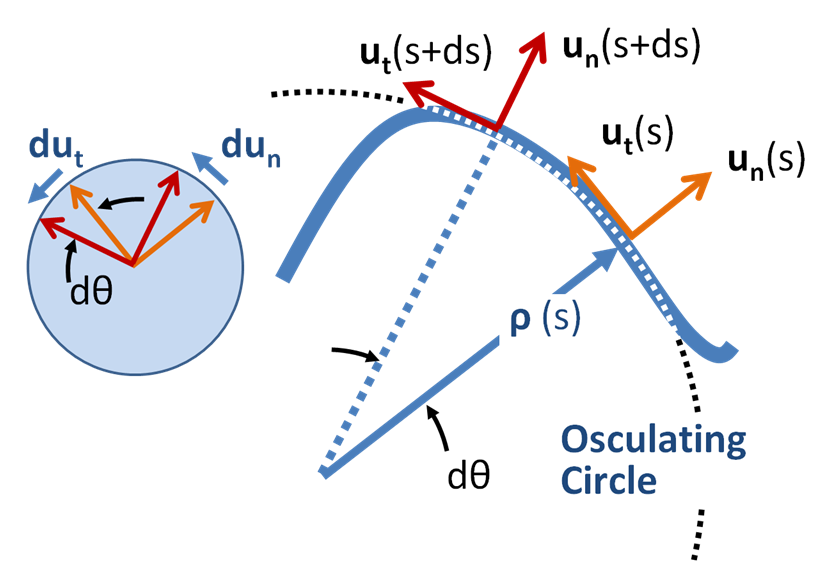
Local coordinate system for planar motion on a curve. Two different positions are shown for distances s and s + ds along the curve. At each position s, unit vector u_{n} points along the outward normal to the curve and unit vector u_{t} is tangential to the path. The radius of curvature of the path is ρ as found from the rate of rotation of the tangent to the curve with respect to arc length, and is the radius of the osculating circle at position s. The unit circle on the left shows the rotation of the unit vectors with s.

Local coordinates mean a set of coordinates that travel with the particle, and have orientation determined by the path of the particle. Unit vectors are formed as shown in the image at right, both tangential and normal to the path. This coordinate system sometimes is referred to as intrinsic or path coordinates or nt-coordinates, for normal-tangential, referring to these unit vectors. These coordinates are a very special example of a more general concept of local coordinates from the theory of differential forms.

Distance along the path of the particle is the arc length s, considered to be a known function of time.

$$s = s(t) \ .$$

A center of curvature is defined at each position s located a distance ρ (the radius of curvature) from the curve on a line along the normal u_{n} (s). The required distance ρ(s) at arc length s is defined in terms of the rate of rotation of the tangent to the curve, which in turn is determined by the path itself. If the orientation of the tangent relative to some starting position is θ(s), then ρ(s) is defined by the derivative dθ/ds:

$$\frac{1} {\rho (s)} = \kappa (s) = \frac {\mathrm{d}\theta}{\mathrm{d}s}\ .$$

The radius of curvature usually is taken as positive (that is, as an absolute value), while the curvature κ is a signed quantity.

A geometric approach to finding the center of curvature and the radius of curvature uses a limiting process leading to the osculating circle. See image above.

Using these coordinates, the motion along the path is viewed as a succession of circular paths of ever-changing center, and at each position s constitutes non-uniform circular motion at that position with radius ρ. The local value of the angular rate of rotation then is given by:

$$\omega(s) = \frac{\mathrm{d}\theta}{\mathrm{d}t} = \frac{\mathrm{d}\theta}{\mathrm{d}s} \frac {\mathrm{d}s}{\mathrm{d}t} = \frac{1}{\rho(s)}\ \frac {\mathrm{d}s}{\mathrm{d}t} = \frac{v(s)}{\rho(s)}\ ,$$

with the local speed v given by:

$$v(s) = \frac {\mathrm{d}s}{\mathrm{d}t}\ .$$

As for the other examples above, because unit vectors cannot change magnitude, their rate of change is always perpendicular to their direction (see the left-hand insert in the image above):

$\frac{d\mathbf{u}_\mathrm{n}(s)}{ds} = \mathbf{u}_\mathrm{t}(s)\frac{d\theta}{ds} = \mathbf{u}_\mathrm{t}(s)\frac{1}{\rho} \ ;$ $\frac{d\mathbf{u}_\mathrm{t}(s)}{\mathrm{d}s} = -\mathbf{u}_\mathrm{n}(s)\frac{\mathrm{d}\theta}{\mathrm{d}s} = - \mathbf{u}_\mathrm{n}(s)\frac{1}{\rho} \ .$

Consequently, the velocity and acceleration are:

$$\mathbf{v}(t) = v \mathbf{u}_\mathrm{t}(s)\ ;$$

and using the chain-rule of differentiation:

$\mathbf{a}(t) = \frac{\mathrm{d}v}{\mathrm{d}t} \mathbf{u}_\mathrm{t}(s) - \frac{v^2}{\rho}\mathbf{u}_\mathrm{n}(s) \ ;$ with the tangential acceleration $\frac{\mathrm{\mathrm{d}}v}{\mathrm{\mathrm{d}}t} = \frac{\mathrm{d}v}{\mathrm{d}s}\ \frac{\mathrm{d}s}{\mathrm{d}t} = \frac{\mathrm{d}v}{\mathrm{d}s}\ v \ .$

In this local coordinate system, the acceleration resembles the expression for nonuniform circular motion with the local radius ρ(s), and the centripetal acceleration is identified as the second term.

Extending this approach to three dimensional space curves leads to the Frenet–Serret formulas.

===== Alternative approach =====
Looking at the image above, one might wonder whether adequate account has been taken of the difference in curvature between ρ(s) and ρ(s + ds) in computing the arc length as ds = ρ(s)dθ. Reassurance on this point can be found using a more formal approach outlined below. This approach also makes connection with the article on curvature.

To introduce the unit vectors of the local coordinate system, one approach is to begin in Cartesian coordinates and describe the local coordinates in terms of these Cartesian coordinates. In terms of arc length s, let the path be described as:
$$\mathbf{r}(s) = \left[ x(s),\ y(s) \right] .$$

Then an incremental displacement along the path ds is described by:
$$\mathrm{d}\mathbf{r}(s) = \left[ \mathrm{d}x(s),\ \mathrm{d}y(s) \right] = \left[ x'(s),\ y'(s) \right] \mathrm{d}s \ ,$$

where primes are introduced to denote derivatives with respect to s. The magnitude of this displacement is ds, showing that:

$\left[ x'(s)^2 + y'(s)^2 \right] = 1 \ .$ (Eq. 1)

This displacement is necessarily a tangent to the curve at s, showing that the unit vector tangent to the curve is:
$$\mathbf{u}_\mathrm{t}(s) = \left[ x'(s), \ y'(s) \right] ,$$
while the outward unit vector normal to the curve is
$$\mathbf{u}_\mathrm{n}(s) = \left[ y'(s),\ -x'(s) \right] ,$$

Orthogonality can be verified by showing that the vector dot product is zero. The unit magnitude of these vectors is a consequence of Eq. 1. Using the tangent vector, the angle θ of the tangent to the curve is given by:
$$\sin \theta = \frac{y'(s)}{\sqrt{x'(s)^2 + y'(s)^2}} = y'(s) \ ;$$
and $\cos \theta = \frac{x'(s)}{\sqrt{x'(s)^2 + y'(s)^2}} = x'(s) \ .$

The radius of curvature is introduced completely formally (without need for geometric interpretation) as:
$$\frac{1}{\rho} = \frac{\mathrm{d}\theta}{\mathrm{d}s}\ .$$

The derivative of θ can be found from that for sinθ:
$$\frac{\mathrm{d} \sin\theta}{\mathrm{d}s} = \cos \theta \frac {\mathrm{d}\theta}{\mathrm{d}s} = \frac{1}{\rho} \cos \theta \ = \frac{1}{\rho} x'(s)\ .$$

Now:
$$\frac{\mathrm{d} \sin \theta }{\mathrm{d}s} = \frac{\mathrm{d}}{\mathrm{d}s} \frac{y'(s)}{\sqrt{x'(s)^2 + y'(s)^2}} = \frac{y''(s)x'(s)^2-y'(s)x'(s)x''(s)} {\left(x'(s)^2 + y'(s)^2\right)^{3/2}}\ ,$$
in which the denominator is unity. With this formula for the derivative of the sine, the radius of curvature becomes:
$$\frac {\mathrm{d}\theta}{\mathrm{d}s} = \frac{1}{\rho} = y''(s)x'(s) - y'(s)x''(s) = \frac{y''(s)}{x'(s)} = -\frac{x''(s)}{y'(s)} \ ,$$
where the equivalence of the forms stems from differentiation of Eq. 1:
$$x'(s)x''(s) + y'(s)y''(s) = 0 \ .$$
With these results, the acceleration can be found:
$$\begin{align}
\mathbf{a}(s) &= \frac{\mathrm{d}}{\mathrm{d}t}\mathbf{v}(s) = \frac{\mathrm{d}}{\mathrm{d}t}\left[\frac{\mathrm{d}s}{\mathrm{d}t} \left( x'(s), \ y'(s) \right) \right] \\
& = \left(\frac{\mathrm{d}^2s}{\mathrm{d}t^2}\right)\mathbf{u}_\mathrm{t}(s) + \left(\frac{\mathrm{d}s}{\mathrm{d}t}\right) ^2 \left(x''(s),\ y''(s) \right) \\
& = \left(\frac{\mathrm{d}^2s}{\mathrm{d}t^2}\right)\mathbf{u}_\mathrm{t}(s) - \left(\frac{\mathrm{d}s}{\mathrm{d}t}\right) ^2 \frac{1}{\rho} \mathbf{u}_\mathrm{n}(s)
\end{align}$$
as can be verified by taking the dot product with the unit vectors u_{t}(s) and u_{n}(s). This result for acceleration is the same as that for circular motion based on the radius ρ. Using this coordinate system in the inertial frame, it is easy to identify the force normal to the trajectory as the centripetal force and that parallel to the trajectory as the tangential force. From a qualitative standpoint, the path can be approximated by an arc of a circle for a limited time, and for the limited time a particular radius of curvature applies, the centrifugal and Euler forces can be analyzed on the basis of circular motion with that radius.

This result for acceleration agrees with that found earlier. However, in this approach, the question of the change in radius of curvature with s is handled completely formally, consistent with a geometric interpretation, but not relying upon it, thereby avoiding any questions the image above might suggest about neglecting the variation in ρ.

===== Example: circular motion =====
To illustrate the above formulas, let x, y be given as:

$$x = \alpha \cos \frac{s}{\alpha} \ ; \ y = \alpha \sin\frac{s}{\alpha} \ .$$

Then:

$$x^2 + y^2 = \alpha^2 \ ,$$

which can be recognized as a circular path around the origin with radius α. The position s = 0 corresponds to [α, 0], or 3 o'clock. To use the above formalism, the derivatives are needed:

$$y^{\prime}(s) = \cos \frac{s}{\alpha} \ ; \ x^{\prime}(s) = -\sin \frac{s}{\alpha} \ ,$$
$$y^{\prime\prime}(s) = -\frac{1}{\alpha}\sin\frac{s}{\alpha} \ ; \ x^{\prime\prime}(s) = -\frac{1}{\alpha}\cos \frac{s}{\alpha} \ .$$

With these results, one can verify that:

$$x^{\prime}(s)^2 + y^{\prime}(s)^2 = 1 \ ; \ \frac{1}{\rho} = y^{\prime\prime}(s)x^{\prime}(s)-y^{\prime}(s)x^{\prime\prime}(s) = \frac{1}{\alpha} \ .$$

The unit vectors can also be found:

$$\mathbf{u}_\mathrm{t}(s) = \left[-\sin\frac{s}{\alpha} \ , \ \cos\frac{s}{\alpha} \right] \ ; \ \mathbf{u}_\mathrm{n}(s) = \left[\cos\frac{s}{\alpha} \ , \ \sin\frac{s}{\alpha} \right] \ ,$$

which serve to show that s = 0 is located at position [ρ, 0] and s = ρπ/2 at [0, ρ], which agrees with the original expressions for x and y. In other words, s is measured counterclockwise around the circle from 3 o'clock. Also, the derivatives of these vectors can be found:

$$\frac{\mathrm{d}}{\mathrm{d}s}\mathbf{u}_\mathrm{t}(s) = -\frac{1}{\alpha} \left[\cos\frac{s}{\alpha} \ , \ \sin\frac{s}{\alpha} \right] = -\frac{1}{\alpha}\mathbf{u}_\mathrm{n}(s) \ ;$$
$$\ \frac{\mathrm{d}}{\mathrm{d}s}\mathbf{u}_\mathrm{n}(s) = \frac{1}{\alpha} \left[-\sin\frac{s}{\alpha} \ , \ \cos\frac{s}{\alpha} \right] = \frac{1}{\alpha}\mathbf{u}_\mathrm{t}(s) \ .$$

To obtain velocity and acceleration, a time-dependence for s is necessary. For counterclockwise motion at variable speed v(t):

$$s(t) = \int_0^t \ dt^{\prime} \ v(t^{\prime}) \ ,$$

where v(t) is the speed and t is time, and s(t = 0) = 0. Then:

$$\mathbf{v} = v(t)\mathbf{u}_\mathrm{t}(s) \ ,$$
$$\mathbf{a} = \frac{\mathrm{d}v}{\mathrm{d}t}\mathbf{u}_\mathrm{t}(s) + v\frac{\mathrm{d}}{\mathrm{d}t}\mathbf{u}_\mathrm{t}(s) = \frac{\mathrm{d}v}{\mathrm{d}t}\mathbf{u}_\mathrm{t}(s)-v\frac{1}{\alpha}\mathbf{u}_\mathrm{n}(s)\frac{\mathrm{d}s}{\mathrm{d}t}$$
$$\mathbf{a} = \frac{\mathrm{d}v}{\mathrm{d}t}\mathbf{u}_\mathrm{t}(s)-\frac{v^2}{\alpha}\mathbf{u}_\mathrm{n}(s) \ ,$$

where it already is established that α = ρ. This acceleration is the standard result for non-uniform circular motion.

== See also ==
- Analytical mechanics
- Applied mechanics
- Bertrand theorem
- Central force
- Centrifugal force
- Circular motion
- Classical mechanics
- Coriolis force
- Dynamics (physics)
- Eskimo yo-yo
- Example: circular motion
- Fictitious force
- Frenet-Serret formulas
- History of centrifugal and centripetal forces
- Kinematics
- Kinetics
- Orthogonal coordinates
- Reactive centrifugal force
- Statics
