= Lists of physics equations =

In physics, there are equations in every field to relate physical quantities to each other and perform calculations. Entire handbooks of equations can only summarize most of the full subject, else are highly specialized within a certain field. Physics is derived of formulae only.

== General scope ==
- Variables commonly used in physics
- Continuity equation
- Constitutive equation

== Specific scope ==
- Defining equation (physical chemistry)
- List of equations in classical mechanics
- Table of thermodynamic equations
- List of equations in wave theory
- List of relativistic equations
- List of equations in fluid mechanics
- List of electromagnetism equations
- List of equations in gravitation
- List of photonics equations
- List of equations in quantum mechanics
- List of equations in nuclear and particle physics

== See also ==
- List of equations
- Operator (physics)
- Laws of science

== Units and nomenclature ==
- Physical constant
- Physical quantity
- SI units
- SI derived unit
- SI electromagnetism units
- List of common physics notations
