= List of equations in fluid mechanics =

This article summarizes equations in the theory of fluid mechanics.

== Definitions ==
Flux F through a surface, dS is the differential vector area element, n is the unit normal to the surface. Left: No flux passes in the surface, the maximum amount flows normal to the surface. Right: The reduction in flux passing through a surface can be visualized by reduction in F or dS equivalently (resolved into components, θ is angle to normal n). F•dS is the component of flux passing through the surface, multiplied by the area of the surface (see dot product). For this reason flux represents physically a flow per unit area.

Here $\mathbf{\hat{t}} \,\!$ is a unit vector in the direction of the flow/current/flux.

Quantity (common name/s)	(Common) symbol/s	Defining equation	SI units	Dimension
Flow velocity vector field	u	$\mathbf{u}=\mathbf{u}\left ( \mathbf{r},t \right ) \,\!$	m s^{−1}	[L][T]^{−1}
Velocity pseudovector field	ω	$\boldsymbol{\omega} = \nabla\times\mathbf{v}$	s^{−1}	[T]^{−1}
Volume velocity, volume flux	φ_{V} (no standard symbol)	$\phi_V = \int_S \mathbf{u} \cdot \mathrm{d}\mathbf{A}\,\!$	m^{3} s^{−1}	[L]^{3} [T]^{−1}
Mass current per unit volume	s (no standard symbol)	$s = \mathrm{d}\rho / \mathrm{d}t \,\!$	kg m^{−3} s^{−1}	[M] [L]^{−3} [T]^{−1}
Mass current, mass flow rate	I_{m}	$I_\mathrm{m} = \mathrm{d} m/\mathrm{d} t \,\!$	kg s^{−1}	[M][T]^{−1}
Mass current density	j_{m}	$I_\mathrm{m} = \iint \mathbf{j}_\mathrm{m} \cdot \mathrm{d}\mathbf{S} \,\!$	kg m^{−2} s^{−1}	[M][L]^{−2}[T]^{−1}
Momentum current	I_{p}	$I_\mathrm{p} = \mathrm{d} \left | \mathbf{p} \right |/\mathrm{d} t \,\!$	kg m s^{−2}	[M][L][T]^{−2}
Momentum current density	j_{p}	$I_\mathrm{p} =\iint \mathbf{j}_\mathrm{p} \cdot \mathrm{d}\mathbf{S}$	kg m s^{−2}	[M][L][T]^{−2}

== Equations ==
Physical situation	Nomenclature	Equations
Fluid statics, pressure gradient	r = Position; ρ = ρ(r) = Fluid density at gravitational equipotential containing r; g = g(r) = Gravitational field strength at point r; ∇P = Pressure gradient	$\nabla P = \rho \mathbf{g}\,\!$
Buoyancy equations	ρ_{f} = Mass density of the fluid; V_{imm} = Immersed volume of body in fluid; F_{b} = Buoyant force; F_{g} = Gravitational force; W_{app} = Apparent weight of immersed body; W = Actual weight of immersed body	Buoyant force $\mathbf{F}_\mathrm{b} = - \rho_f V_\mathrm{imm} \mathbf{g} = - \mathbf{F}_\mathrm{g}\,\!$ Apparent weight $\mathbf{W}_\mathrm{app} = \mathbf{W} - \mathbf{F}_\mathrm{b}\,\!$
Bernoulli's equation	p_{constant} is the total pressure at a point on a streamline	$p + \rho u^2/2 + \rho gy = p_\mathrm{constant}\,\!$
Euler equations	ρ = fluid mass density; u is the flow velocity vector; E = total volume energy density; U = internal energy per unit mass of fluid; p = pressure; $\otimes$ denotes the tensor product	$\frac{\partial\rho}{\partial t}+\nabla\cdot(\rho\mathbf{u})=0\,\!$ $\frac{\partial\rho{\mathbf{u}}}{\partial t} + \nabla \cdot \left ( \mathbf{u}\otimes \left ( \rho \mathbf{u} \right ) \right )+\nabla p=0\,\!$ $\frac{\partial E}{\partial t}+\nabla\cdot\left ( \mathbf u \left ( E+p \right ) \right ) = 0 \,\!$ $E = \rho \left ( U + \frac{1}{2} \mathbf{u}^2 \right ) \,\!$
Convective acceleration		$\mathbf{a} = \left ( \mathbf{u} \cdot \nabla \right ) \mathbf{u}$
Navier–Stokes equations	T_{D} = Deviatoric stress tensor; $\mathbf{f}$ = volume density of the body forces acting on the fluid; $\nabla$ here is the del operator.	$\rho \left(\frac{\partial \mathbf{u}}{\partial t} + \mathbf{u} \cdot \nabla \mathbf{u} \right) = -\nabla p + \nabla \cdot\mathbf{T}_\mathrm{D} + \mathbf{f}$

== See also ==
- Defining equation (physical chemistry)
- List of electromagnetism equations
- List of equations in classical mechanics
- List of equations in gravitation
- List of equations in nuclear and particle physics
- List of equations in quantum mechanics
- List of photonics equations
- List of relativistic equations
- Table of thermodynamic equations

== Sources ==
- P.M. Whelan, M.J. Hodgeson (1978). Essential Principles of Physics (2nd ed.). John Murray. ISBN 0-7195-3382-1.
- G. Woan (2010). The Cambridge Handbook of Physics Formulas. Cambridge University Press. ISBN 978-0-521-57507-2.
- A. Halpern (1988). 3000 Solved Problems in Physics, Schaum Series. Mc Graw Hill. ISBN 978-0-07-025734-4.
- R.G. Lerner, G.L. Trigg (2005). Encyclopaedia of Physics (2nd ed.). VHC Publishers, Hans Warlimont, Springer. pp. 12–13. ISBN 978-0-07-025734-4.
- C.B. Parker (1994). McGraw Hill Encyclopaedia of Physics (2nd ed.). McGraw Hill. ISBN 0-07-051400-3.
- P.A. Tipler, G. Mosca (2008). Physics for Scientists and Engineers: With Modern Physics (6th ed.). W.H. Freeman and Co. ISBN 978-1-4292-0265-7.
- L.N. Hand, J.D. Finch (2008). Analytical Mechanics. Cambridge University Press. ISBN 978-0-521-57572-0.
- T.B. Arkill, C.J. Millar (1974). Mechanics, Vibrations and Waves. John Murray. ISBN 0-7195-2882-8.
- H.J. Pain (1983). The Physics of Vibrations and Waves (3rd ed.). John Wiley & Sons. ISBN 0-471-90182-2.
