= List of equations in quantum mechanics =

This article summarizes equations in the theory of quantum mechanics.

== Wavefunctions ==
A fundamental physical constant occurring in quantum mechanics is the Planck constant, h. A common abbreviation is ħ = h/2π, also known as the reduced Planck constant or Dirac constant.

Quantity (common name/s)	(Common) symbol/s	Defining equation	SI unit	Dimension
Wavefunction	ψ, Ψ	To solve from the Schrödinger equation	varies with situation and number of particles	
Wavefunction probability density	ρ	$\rho = \left | \Psi \right |^2 = \Psi^* \Psi$	m^{−3}	[L]^{−3}
Wavefunction probability current	j	Non-relativistic, no external field: $$\begin{align} \mathbf{j} &= \frac{-i\hbar}{2m} \left(\Psi^* \nabla \Psi - \Psi \nabla \Psi^*\right) \\ &= \frac\hbar m \operatorname{Im}\left(\Psi^*\nabla\Psi\right) = \operatorname{Re} \left(\Psi^* \frac{\hbar}{im} \nabla \Psi\right) \end{align}$$ star * is complex conjugate	m^{−2}⋅s^{−1}	[T]^{−1} [L]^{−2}

The general form of wavefunction for a system of particles, each with position r_{i} and z-component of spin s_{z i}. Sums are over the discrete variable s_{z}, integrals over continuous positions r.

For clarity and brevity, the coordinates are collected into tuples, the indices label the particles (which cannot be done physically, but is mathematically necessary). Following are general mathematical results, used in calculations.

Property or effect	Nomenclature	Equation
Wavefunction for N particles in 3d	r = (r_{1}, r_{2}... r_{N}); s_{z} = (s_{z 1}, s_{z 2}, ..., s_{z N})	In function notation: $\Psi = \Psi \left (\mathbf{r}, \mathbf{s_z}, t \right )$ in bra–ket notation: $|\Psi\rangle = \sum_{s_{z1}} \sum_{s_{z2}}\cdots\sum_{s_{zN}}\int_{V_1}\int_{V_2}\cdots\int_{V_N} \mathrm{d}\mathbf{r}_1\mathrm{d}\mathbf{r}_2\cdots\mathrm{d}\mathbf{r}_N \Psi |\mathbf{r}, \mathbf{s_z}\rangle$ for non-interacting particles: $\Psi = \prod_{n=1}^N\Psi \left (\mathbf{r}_n,s_{zn}, t \right )$
Position-momentum Fourier transform (1 particle in 3d)	Φ = momentum–space wavefunction; Ψ = position–space wavefunction	$$\begin{align} \Phi(\mathbf{p},s_z,t) & = \frac{1}{\sqrt{2\pi\hbar}^3} \int\limits_{\mathrm{all \, space}} e^{-i\mathbf{p}\cdot\mathbf{r}/\hbar} \Psi(\mathbf{r}, s_z,t)\mathrm{d}^3\mathbf{r} \\ &\upharpoonleft \downharpoonright\\ \Psi(\mathbf{r},s_z,t) & = \frac{1}{\sqrt{2\pi\hbar}^3} \int\limits_{\mathrm{all \, space}} e^{+i\mathbf{p}\cdot\mathbf{r}/\hbar} \Phi(\mathbf{p},s_z,t)\mathrm{d}^3\mathbf{p}_n \\ \end{align}$$
General probability distribution	V_{j} = volume (3d region) particle may occupy, P = Probability that particle 1 has position r_{1} in volume V_{1} with spin s_{z1} and particle 2 has position r_{2} in volume V_{2} with spin s_{z2}, etc.	$P = \sum_{s_{zN}}\cdots\sum_{s_{z2}}\sum_{s_{z1}}\int_{V_N}\cdots\int_{V_2}\int_{V_1} \left | \Psi \right |^2\mathrm{d}^3\mathbf{r}_1\mathrm{d}^3\mathbf{r}_2\cdots\mathrm{d}^3\mathbf{r}_N\,\!$
General normalization condition		$P = \sum_{s_{zN}}\cdots\sum_{s_{z2}}\sum_{s_{z1}}\int\limits_{\mathrm{all \, space}}\cdots\int\limits_{\mathrm{all \, space}}\;\int\limits_{\mathrm{all \, space}} \left | \Psi \right |^2\mathrm{d}^3\mathbf{r}_1\mathrm{d}^3\mathbf{r}_2\cdots\mathrm{d}^3\mathbf{r}_N = 1\,\!$

== Equations ==
=== Wave–particle duality and time evolution ===
Property or effect	Nomenclature	Equation
Planck–Einstein equation and de Broglie wavelength relations	P = (E/c, p) is the four-momentum, K = (ω/c, k) is the four-wavevector, E = energy of particle; ω = 2πf is the angular frequency and frequency of the particle; ħ = h/2π are the Planck constants; c = speed of light	$\mathbf{P} = (E/c, \mathbf{p}) = \hbar(\omega /c ,\mathbf{k}) = \hbar \mathbf{K}$
Schrödinger equation	Ψ = wavefunction of the system; Ĥ = Hamiltonian operator, E = energy eigenvalue of system; i is the imaginary unit; t = time	General time-dependent case: $i\hbar\frac{\partial}{\partial t} \Psi = \hat{H}\Psi$ Time-independent case: $\hat{H}\Psi = E\Psi$
Heisenberg equation	Â = operator of an observable property; [ ] is the commutator; $\langle \, \rangle$ denotes the average	$\frac{d}{dt}\hat{A}(t)=\frac{i}{\hbar}[\hat{H},\hat{A}(t)]+\frac{\partial \hat{A}(t)}{\partial t}$
Time evolution in Heisenberg picture (Ehrenfest theorem)	m = mass, V = potential energy, r = position, p = momentum, of a particle.	$\frac{d}{dt}\langle \hat{A}\rangle = \frac{1}{i\hbar}\langle [\hat{A},\hat{H}] \rangle+ \left\langle \frac{\partial \hat{A}}{\partial t}\right\rangle$ For momentum and position; $m\frac{d}{dt}\langle \mathbf{r}\rangle = \langle \mathbf{p} \rangle$ $\frac{d}{dt}\langle \mathbf{p}\rangle = -\langle \nabla V \rangle$

==== Non-relativistic time-independent Schrödinger equation ====
Summarized below are the various forms the Hamiltonian takes, with the corresponding Schrödinger equations and forms of wavefunction solutions. Notice in the case of one spatial dimension, for one particle, the partial derivative reduces to an ordinary derivative.

	One particle	N particles
One dimension	$\hat{H} = \frac{\hat{p}^2}{2m} + V(x) = -\frac{\hbar^2}{2m}\frac{d^2}{d x^2} + V(x)$	$$\begin{align} \hat{H} &= \sum_{n=1}^{N}\frac{\hat{p}_n^2}{2m_n} + V(x_1,x_2,\cdots x_N) \\ & = -\frac{\hbar^2}{2}\sum_{n=1}^{N}\frac{1}{m_n}\frac{\partial^2}{\partial x_n^2} + V(x_1,x_2,\cdots x_N) \end{align}$$ where the position of particle n is x_{n}.
One dimension	$E\Psi = -\frac{\hbar^2}{2m}\frac{d^2}{d x^2}\Psi + V\Psi$	$E\Psi = -\frac{\hbar^2}{2}\sum_{n=1}^{N}\frac{1}{m_n}\frac{\partial^2}{\partial x_n^2}\Psi + V\Psi \, .$
One dimension	$\Psi(x,t)=\psi(x) e^{-iEt/\hbar} \, .$ There is a further restriction — the solution must not grow at infinity, so that it has either a finite L^{2}-norm (if it is a bound state) or a slowly diverging norm (if it is part of a continuum): $\| \psi \|^2 = \int |\psi(x)|^2\, dx.\,$	$\Psi = e^{-iEt/\hbar}\psi(x_1,x_2\cdots x_N)$ for non-interacting particles $\Psi = e^{-i{E t/\hbar}}\prod_{n=1}^N\psi(x_n) \, , \quad V(x_1,x_2,\cdots x_N) = \sum_{n=1}^N V(x_n) \, .$
Three dimensions	$$\begin{align}\hat{H} & = \frac{\hat{\mathbf{p}}\cdot\hat{\mathbf{p}}}{2m} + V(\mathbf{r}) \\ & = -\frac{\hbar^2}{2m}\nabla^2 + V(\mathbf{r}) \end{align}$$ where the position of the particle is r = (x, y, z).	$$\begin{align} \hat{H} & = \sum_{n=1}^{N}\frac{\hat{\mathbf{p}}_n\cdot\hat{\mathbf{p}}_n}{2m_n} + V(\mathbf{r}_1,\mathbf{r}_2,\cdots\mathbf{r}_N) \\ & = -\frac{\hbar^2}{2}\sum_{n=1}^{N}\frac{1}{m_n}\nabla_n^2 + V(\mathbf{r}_1,\mathbf{r}_2,\cdots\mathbf{r}_N) \end{align}$$ where the position of particle n is r _{n} = (x_{n}, y_{n}, z_{n}), and the Laplacian for particle n using the corresponding position coordinates is $\nabla_n^2=\frac{\partial^2}{{\partial x_n}^2} + \frac{\partial^2}{{\partial y_n}^2} + \frac{\partial^2}{{\partial z_n}^2}$
Three dimensions	$E\Psi = -\frac{\hbar^2}{2m}\nabla^2\Psi + V\Psi$	$E\Psi = -\frac{\hbar^2}{2}\sum_{n=1}^{N}\frac{1}{m_n}\nabla_n^2\Psi + V\Psi$
Three dimensions	$\Psi = \psi(\mathbf{r}) e^{-iEt/\hbar}$	$\Psi = e^{-iEt/\hbar}\psi(\mathbf{r}_1,\mathbf{r}_2\cdots \mathbf{r}_N)$ for non-interacting particles $\Psi = e^{-i{E t/\hbar}}\prod_{n=1}^N\psi(\mathbf{r}_n) \, , \quad V(\mathbf{r}_1,\mathbf{r}_2,\cdots \mathbf{r}_N) = \sum_{n=1}^N V(\mathbf{r}_n)$

==== Non-relativistic time-dependent Schrödinger equation ====
Again, summarized below are the various forms the Hamiltonian takes, with the corresponding Schrödinger equations and forms of solutions.

	One particle	N particles
One dimension	$\hat{H} = \frac{\hat{p}^2}{2m} + V(x,t) = -\frac{\hbar^2}{2m}\frac{\partial^2}{\partial x^2} + V(x,t)$	$$\begin{align} \hat{H} &= \sum_{n=1}^{N}\frac{\hat{p}_n^2}{2m_n} + V(x_1,x_2,\cdots x_N,t) \\ &= -\frac{\hbar^2}{2}\sum_{n=1}^{N}\frac{1}{m_n}\frac{\partial^2}{\partial x_n^2} + V(x_1,x_2,\cdots x_N,t) \end{align}$$ where the position of particle n is x_{n}.
One dimension	$i\hbar\frac{\partial}{\partial t}\Psi = -\frac{\hbar^2}{2m}\frac{\partial^2}{\partial x^2}\Psi + V\Psi$	$i\hbar\frac{\partial}{\partial t}\Psi = -\frac{\hbar^2}{2}\sum_{n=1}^{N}\frac{1}{m_n}\frac{\partial^2}{\partial x_n^2}\Psi + V\Psi \, .$
One dimension	$\Psi = \Psi(x,t)$	$\Psi = \Psi(x_1,x_2\cdots x_N,t)$
Three dimensions	$$\begin{align}\hat{H} & = \frac{\hat{\mathbf{p}}\cdot\hat{\mathbf{p}}}{2m} + V(\mathbf{r},t) \\ & = -\frac{\hbar^2}{2m}\nabla^2 + V(\mathbf{r},t) \\ \end{align}$$	$$\begin{align} \hat{H} & = \sum_{n=1}^{N}\frac{\hat{\mathbf{p}}_n\cdot\hat{\mathbf{p}}_n}{2m_n} + V(\mathbf{r}_1,\mathbf{r}_2,\cdots\mathbf{r}_N,t) \\ & = -\frac{\hbar^2}{2}\sum_{n=1}^{N}\frac{1}{m_n}\nabla_n^2 + V(\mathbf{r}_1,\mathbf{r}_2,\cdots\mathbf{r}_N,t) \end{align}$$
Three dimensions	$i\hbar\frac{\partial}{\partial t}\Psi = -\frac{\hbar^2}{2m}\nabla^2\Psi + V\Psi$	$i\hbar\frac{\partial}{\partial t}\Psi = -\frac{\hbar^2}{2}\sum_{n=1}^{N}\frac{1}{m_n}\nabla_n^2\Psi + V\Psi$ This last equation is in a very high dimension, so the solutions are not easy to visualize.
Three dimensions	$\Psi = \Psi(\mathbf{r},t)$	$\Psi = \Psi(\mathbf{r}_1,\mathbf{r}_2,\cdots\mathbf{r}_N,t)$

=== Photoemission ===
Property/Effect	Nomenclature	Equation
Photoelectric equation	K_{max} = Maximum kinetic energy of ejected electron (J); h = Planck constant; f = frequency of incident photons (Hz = s^{−1}); φ, Φ = Work function of the material the photons are incident on (J)	$K_\mathrm{max} = hf - \Phi\,\!$
Threshold frequency and Work function	φ, Φ = Work function of the material the photons are incident on (J); f_{0}, ν_{0} = Threshold frequency (Hz = s^{−1})	Can only be found by experiment. The De Broglie relations give the relation between them: $\phi = hf_0\,\!$
Photon momentum	p = momentum of photon (kg m s^{−1}); f = frequency of photon (Hz = s^{−1}); λ = wavelength of photon (m)	The De Broglie relations give: $p = hf/c = h/\lambda\,\!$

=== Quantum uncertainty ===
Property or effect	Nomenclature	Equation
Heisenberg's uncertainty principles	n = number of photons; φ = wave phase; [, ] = commutator	Position–momentum $\sigma(x) \sigma(p) \ge \frac{\hbar}{2} \,\!$ Energy-time $\sigma(E) \sigma(t) \ge \frac{\hbar}{2} \,\!$ Number-phase $\sigma(n) \sigma(\phi) \ge \frac{\hbar}{2} \,\!$
Dispersion of observable	A = observables (eigenvalues of operator)	$$\begin{align} \sigma(A)^2 & = \langle(A-\langle A \rangle)^2\rangle \\ & = \langle A^2 \rangle - \langle A \rangle^2 \end{align}$$
General uncertainty relation	A, B = observables (eigenvalues of operator)	$\sigma(A)\sigma(B) \geq \frac{1}{2}\langle i[\hat{A}, \hat{B}] \rangle$

Probability Distributions
Property or effect	Equation
Density of states	$N(E) = 8\sqrt{2}\pi m^{3/2}E^{1/2}/h^3\,\!$
Fermi–Dirac distribution (fermions)	$P(E_i) = \frac{g(E_i)}{e^{(E-\mu)/kT} + 1}$ where: P(E_{i}) = probability of energy E_{i}; g(E_{i}) = degeneracy of energy E_{i} (no of states with same energy); μ = chemical potential
Bose–Einstein distribution (bosons)	$P(E_i) = \frac{g(E_i)}{e^{(E_i-\mu)/kT}-1}$

=== Angular momentum ===
Property or effect	Nomenclature	Equation
Angular momentum quantum numbers	s = spin quantum number; m_{s} = spin magnetic quantum number; ℓ = Azimuthal quantum number; m_{ℓ} = azimuthal magnetic quantum number; j = total angular momentum quantum number; m_{j} = total angular momentum magnetic quantum number	Spin: $$\begin{align}& \Vert \mathbf{s} \Vert = \sqrt{s \, (s+1)} \, \hbar \\ & m_s \in \{-s,-s+1\cdots s-1,s\}\\ \end{align}\,\!$$ Orbital: $$\begin{align}& \ell \in \{0 \cdots n-1\} \\ & m_\ell \in \{-\ell,-\ell+1\cdots \ell-1,\ell\}\\ \end{align}\,\!$$ Total: $$\begin{align}& j = \ell +s \\ & m_j \in \{|\ell-s|,|\ell-s|+1 \cdots |\ell+s|-1,|\ell+s| \} \\ \end{align}\,\!$$
Angular momentum magnitudes	angular momementa: S = Spin, L = orbital, J = total	Spin magnitude: $|\mathbf{S}| = \hbar\sqrt{s(s+1)}\,\!$ Orbital magnitude: $|\mathbf{L}| = \hbar\sqrt{\ell(\ell+1)}\,\!$ Total magnitude: $\mathbf{J} = \mathbf{L} + \mathbf{S}\,\!$ $|\mathbf{J}| = \hbar\sqrt{j(j+1)}\,\!$
Angular momentum components		Spin: $S_z = m_s \hbar\,\!$ Orbital: $L_z = m_\ell \hbar\,\!$

Magnetic moments

In what follows, B is an applied external magnetic field and the quantum numbers above are used.

Property or effect	Nomenclature	Equation
orbital magnetic dipole moment	e = electron charge; m_{e} = electron rest mass; L = electron orbital angular momentum; g_{ℓ} = orbital Landé g-factor; μ_{B} = Bohr magneton	$\boldsymbol{\mu}_\ell = -e\mathbf{L}/2m_e = g_\ell \frac{\mu_B}{\hbar} \mathbf{L}\,\!$ z-component: $\mu_{\ell,z} = -m_\ell\mu_B\,\!$
spin magnetic dipole moment	S = electron spin angular momentum; g_{s} = spin Landé g-factor	$\boldsymbol{\mu}_s = -e\mathbf{S}/m_e = g_s \frac{\mu_B}{\hbar} \mathbf{S}\,\!$ z-component: $\mu_{s,z} = -e S_z/m_e = g_seS_z/2m_e\,\!$
dipole moment potential	U = potential energy of dipole in field	$U = -\boldsymbol{\mu}\cdot\mathbf{B} = -\mu_z B\,\!$

=== Hydrogen atom ===
Property or effect	Nomenclature	Equation
Energy level	E_{n} = energy eigenvalue; n = principal quantum number; e = electron charge; m_{e} = electron rest mass; ε_{0} = permittivity of free space; h = Planck constant	$E_n = -m e^4 / 8\varepsilon_0^2 h^2 n^2 = -13.61\,\mathrm{eV}/n^2$
Spectrum	λ = wavelength of emitted photon, during electronic transition from E_{i} to E_{j}	$\frac{1}{\lambda} = R\left(\frac{1}{n_j^2} - \frac{1}{n_i^2}\right), \, n_j<n_i\,\!$

== See also ==
- Defining equation (physical chemistry)
- List of electromagnetism equations
- List of equations in classical mechanics
- List of equations in fluid mechanics
- List of equations in gravitation
- List of equations in nuclear and particle physics
- List of equations in wave theory
- List of photonics equations
- List of relativistic equations

== Sources ==
- P.M. Whelan; M.J. Hodgeson (1978). Essential Principles of Physics (2nd ed.). John Murray. ISBN 0-7195-3382-1.
- G. Woan (2010). The Cambridge Handbook of Physics Formulas. Cambridge University Press. ISBN 978-0-521-57507-2.
- A. Halpern (1988). 3000 Solved Problems in Physics, Schaum Series. Mc Graw Hill. ISBN 978-0-07-025734-4.
- R. G. Lerner; G. L. Trigg (2005). Encyclopaedia of Physics (2nd ed.). VHC Publishers, Hans Warlimont, Springer. pp. 12–13. ISBN 978-0-07-025734-4.
- C. B. Parker (1994). McGraw Hill Encyclopaedia of Physics (2nd ed.). McGraw Hill. ISBN 0-07-051400-3.
- P. A. Tipler; G. Mosca (2008). Physics for Scientists and Engineers: With Modern Physics (6th ed.). W. H. Freeman and Co. ISBN 978-1-4292-0265-7.
- L.N. Hand; J. D. Finch (2008). Analytical Mechanics. Cambridge University Press. ISBN 978-0-521-57572-0.
- T. B. Arkill; C. J. Millar (1974). Mechanics, Vibrations and Waves. John Murray. ISBN 0-7195-2882-8.
- H.J. Pain (1983). The Physics of Vibrations and Waves (3rd ed.). John Wiley & Sons. ISBN 0-471-90182-2.
- J. R. Forshaw; A. G. Smith (2009). Dynamics and Relativity. Wiley. ISBN 978-0-470-01460-8.
- G. A. G. Bennet (1974). Electricity and Modern Physics (2nd ed.). Edward Arnold (UK). ISBN 0-7131-2459-8.
- I. S. Grant; W. R. Phillips; Manchester Physics (2008). Electromagnetism (2nd ed.). John Wiley & Sons. ISBN 978-0-471-92712-9.
- D.J. Griffiths (2007). Introduction to Electrodynamics (3rd ed.). Pearson Education, Dorling Kindersley. ISBN 978-81-7758-293-2.
