= List of electromagnetism equations =

This article summarizes equations in the theory of electromagnetism.

== Definitions ==
Lorentz force on a charged particle (of charge q) in motion (velocity v), used as the definition of the E field and B field.

Here subscripts e and m are used to differ between electric and magnetic charges. The definitions for monopoles are of theoretical interest, although real magnetic dipoles can be described using pole strengths. There are two possible units for monopole strength, Wb (Weber) and A m (Ampere metre). Dimensional analysis shows that magnetic charges relate by q_{m}(Wb) = μ_{0} q_{m}(Am).

=== Initial quantities ===
Quantity (common name/s)	(Common) symbol/s	SI units	Dimension
Electric charge	q_{e}, q, Q	C = As	[I][T]
Monopole strength, magnetic charge	q_{m}, g, p	Wb or Am	[L]^{2}[M][T]^{−2} [I]^{−1} (Wb) [I][L] (Am)

=== Electric quantities ===
Continuous charge distribution. The volume charge density ρ is the amount of charge per unit volume (cube), surface charge density σ is amount per unit surface area (circle) with outward unit normal n̂, d is the dipole moment between two point charges, the volume density of these is the polarization density P. Position vector r is a point to calculate the electric field; r′ is a point in the charged object.

Contrary to the strong analogy between (classical) gravitation and electrostatics, there are no "centre of charge" or "centre of electrostatic attraction" analogues.

Electric transport

Quantity (common name/s)	(Common) symbol/s	Defining equation	SI units	Dimension
Linear, surface, volumetric charge density	λ_{e} for Linear, σ_{e} for surface, ρ_{e} for volume.	$q_e = \int \lambda_e \mathrm{d}\ell$ $q_e = \iint \sigma_e \mathrm{d} S$ $q_e = \iiint \rho_e \mathrm{d}V$	C m^{−n}, n = 1, 2, 3	[I][T][L]^{−n}
Capacitance	C	$C = {\mathrm{d}q\over\mathrm{d}V}\,\!$ V = voltage, not volume.	F = C V^{−1}	[I]^{2}[T]^{4}[L]^{−2}[M]^{−1}
Electric current	I	$I = {\mathrm{d}q\over\mathrm{d}t} \,\!$	A	[I]
Electric current density	J	$I = \mathbf{J} \cdot \mathrm{d} \mathbf{S}$	A m^{−2}	[I][L]^{−2}
Displacement current density	J_{d}	$\mathbf{J}_\mathrm{d} = {\partial\mathbf{D}\over\partial t} = \varepsilon_0 \left ({\partial\mathbf{E}\over\partial t}\right) \,\!$	A m^{−2}	[I][L]^{−2}
Convection current density	J_{c}	$\mathbf{J}_\mathrm{c} = \rho \mathbf{v} \,\!$	A m^{−2}	[I][L]^{−2}

Electric fields

Quantity (common name/s)	(Common) symbol/s	Defining equation	SI units	Dimension
Electric field, field strength, flux density, potential gradient	E	$\mathbf{E} ={\mathbf{F}\over q}\,\!$	N C^{−1} = V m^{−1}	[M][L][T]^{−3}[I]^{−1}
Electric flux	Φ_{E}	$\Phi_E = \int_S \mathbf{E} \cdot \mathrm{d} \mathbf{A}\,\!$	N m^{2} C^{−1}	[M][L]^{3}[T]^{−3}[I]^{−1}
Absolute permittivity;	ε	$\varepsilon = \varepsilon_r \varepsilon_0\,\!$	F m^{−1}	[I]^{2} [T]^{4} [M]^{−1} [L]^{−3}
Electric dipole moment	p	$\mathbf{p} = q\mathbf{a}\,\!$ a = charge separation directed from -ve to +ve charge	C m	[I][T][L]
Electric Polarization, polarization density	P	$\mathbf{P} = {\mathrm{d}\langle\mathbf{p}\rangle\over\mathrm{d} V} \,\!$	C m^{−2}	[I][T][L]^{−2}
Electric displacement field, flux density	D	$\mathbf{D} = \varepsilon\mathbf{E} = \varepsilon_0 \mathbf{E} + \mathbf{P}\,$	C m^{−2}	[I][T][L]^{−2}
Electric displacement flux	Φ_{D}	$\Phi_D = \int_S \mathbf{D} \cdot \mathrm{d} \mathbf{A}\,\!$	C	[I][T]
Absolute electric potential, EM scalar potential relative to point $r_0 \,\!$ Theoretical: $r_0 = \infty \,\!$ Practical: $r_0 = R_\mathrm{earth} \,\!$ (Earth's radius)	φ ,V	$V = -\frac{W_{\infty r }}{q} = -\frac{1}{q}\int_\infty^r \mathbf{F} \cdot \mathrm{d} \mathbf{r} = -\int_{r_1}^{r_2} \mathbf{E} \cdot \mathrm{d} \mathbf{r}\,\!$	V = J C^{−1}	[M] [L]^{2} [T]^{−3} [I]^{−1}
Voltage, Electric potential difference	Δφ,ΔV	$\Delta V = -\frac{\Delta W}{q} = -\frac{1}{q}\int_{r_1}^{r_2} \mathbf{F} \cdot \mathrm{d} \mathbf{r} = -\int_{r_1}^{r_2} \mathbf{E} \cdot \mathrm{d} \mathbf{r} \,\!$	V = J C^{−1}	[M] [L]^{2} [T]^{−3} [I]^{−1}

=== Magnetic quantities ===
Magnetic transport

Quantity (common name/s)	(Common) symbol/s	Defining equation	SI units	Dimension
Linear, surface, volumetric pole density	λ_{m} for Linear, σ_{m} for surface, ρ_{m} for volume.	$q_m = \int \lambda_m \mathrm{d}\ell$ $q_m = \iint \sigma_m \mathrm{d} S$ $q_m = \iiint \rho_m \mathrm{d}V$	Wb m^{−n} A m^{(−n + 1)}, n = 1, 2, 3	[L]^{2}[M][T]^{−2} [I]^{−1} (Wb) [I][L] (Am)
Monopole current	I_{m}	$I_m = {\mathrm{d}q_m\over\mathrm{dt}} \,\!$	Wb s^{−1} A m s^{−1}	[L]^{2}[M][T]^{−3} [I]^{−1} (Wb) [I][L][T]^{−1} (Am)
Monopole current density	J_{m}	$I = \iint \mathbf{J}_\mathrm{m} \cdot \mathrm{d} \mathbf{A}$	Wb s^{−1} m^{−2} A m^{−1} s^{−1}	[M][T]^{−3} [I]^{−1} (Wb) [I][L]^{−1}[T]^{−1} (Am)

Magnetic fields

Quantity (common name/s)	(Common) symbol/s	Defining equation	SI units	Dimension
Magnetic field, field strength, flux density, induction field	B	$\mathbf{F} =q_e \left ( \mathbf{v}\times\mathbf{B} \right ) \,\!$	T = N A^{−1} m^{−1} = Wb m^{−2}	[M][T]^{−2}[I]^{−1}
Magnetic potential, EM vector potential	A	$\mathbf{B} = \nabla \times \mathbf{A}$	T m = N A^{−1} = Wb m^{3}	[M][L][T]^{−2}[I]^{−1}
Magnetic flux	Φ_{B}	$\Phi_B = \int_S \mathbf{B} \cdot \mathrm{d} \mathbf{A}\,\!$	Wb = T m^{2}	[L]^{2}[M][T]^{−2}[I]^{−1}
Magnetic permeability	$\mu \,\!$	$\mu \ = \mu_r \,\mu_0 \,\!$	V·s·A^{−1}·m^{−1} = N·A^{−2} = T·m·A^{−1} = Wb·A^{−1}·m^{−1}	[M][L][T]^{−2}[I]^{−2}
Magnetic moment, magnetic dipole moment	m, μ_{B}, Π	Two definitions are possible: using pole strengths, $\mathbf{m} = q_m \mathbf{a}\,\!$ using currents: $\mathbf{m} = NIA\mathbf{\hat{n}}\,\!$ a = pole separation N is the number of turns of conductor	A m^{2}	[I][L]^{2}
Magnetization	M	$\mathbf{M} = {\mathrm{d} \langle\mathbf{m}\rangle\over\mathrm{d}V} \,\!$	A m^{−1}	[I] [L]^{−1}
Magnetic field intensity, (AKA field strength)	H	Two definitions are possible: most common: $\mathbf{B} = \mu \mathbf{H} = \mu_0 \left ( \mathbf{H} + \mathbf{M} \right ) \,$ using pole strengths, $\mathbf{H} = {\mathbf{F}\over q_m} \,$	A m^{−1}	[I] [L]^{−1}
Intensity of magnetization, magnetic polarization	I, J	$\mathbf{I} = \mu_0 \mathbf{M} \,\!$	T = N A^{−1} m^{−1} = Wb m^{−2}	[M][T]^{−2}[I]^{−1}
Self Inductance	L	Two equivalent definitions are possible: $L = N\left ( {\mathrm{d}\Phi\over\mathrm{d} I}\right )\,\!$ $L\left({\mathrm{d} I\over\mathrm{d}t}\right) = -NV\,\!$	H = Wb A^{−1}	[L]^{2} [M] [T]^{−2} [I]^{−2}
Mutual inductance	M	Again two equivalent definitions are possible: $M_1 = N\left ({\mathrm{d} \Phi_2\over\mathrm{d}I_1}\right)\,\!$ $M\left({\mathrm{d} I_2\over\mathrm{d}t}\right ) = -NV_1\,\!$ 1,2 subscripts refer to two conductors/inductors mutually inducing voltage/ linking magnetic flux through each other. They can be interchanged for the required conductor/inductor; $M_2 = N\left({\mathrm{d} \Phi_1\over\mathrm{d}I_2}\right)\,\!$ $M\left({\mathrm{d} I_1\over\mathrm{d}t} \right ) = -NV_2\,\!$	H = Wb A^{−1}	[L]^{2} [M] [T]^{−2} [I]^{−2}
Gyromagnetic ratio (for charged particles in a magnetic field)	γ	$\omega = \gamma B \,\!$	Hz T^{−1}	[M]^{−1}[T][I]

=== Electric circuits ===
DC circuits, general definitions

Quantity (common name/s)	(Common) symbol/s	Defining equation	SI units	Dimension
Terminal Voltage for power supply	V_{ter}		V = J C^{−1}	[M] [L]^{2} [T]^{−3} [I]^{−1}
Load Voltage for Circuit	V_{load}		V = J C^{−1}	[M] [L]^{2} [T]^{−3} [I]^{−1}
Internal resistance of power supply	R_{int}	$R_\mathrm{int} = {V_\mathrm{ter}\over I} \,\!$	Ω = V A^{−1} = J s C^{−2}	[M][L]^{2} [T]^{−3} [I]^{−2}
Load resistance of circuit	R_{ext}	$R_\mathrm{ext} = {V_\mathrm{load}\over I} \,\!$	Ω = V A^{−1} = J s C^{−2}	[M][L]^{2} [T]^{−3} [I]^{−2}
Electromotive force (emf), voltage across entire circuit including power supply, external components and conductors	E	$\mathcal{E} = V_\mathrm{ter} + V_\mathrm{load} \,\!$	V = J C^{−1}	[M] [L]^{2} [T]^{−3} [I]^{−1}

AC circuits

Quantity (common name/s)	(Common) symbol/s	Defining equation	SI units	Dimension
Resistive load voltage	V_{R}	$V_R = I_R R \,\!$	V = J C^{−1}	[M] [L]^{2} [T]^{−3} [I]^{−1}
Capacitive load voltage	V_{C}	$V_C = I_C X_C\,\!$	V = J C^{−1}	[M] [L]^{2} [T]^{−3} [I]^{−1}
Inductive load voltage	V_{L}	$V_L = I_L X_L\,\!$	V = J C^{−1}	[M] [L]^{2} [T]^{−3} [I]^{−1}
Capacitive reactance	X_{C}	$X_C = \frac{1}{\omega_\mathrm{d} C} \,\!$	Ω^{−1} m^{−1}	[I]^{2} [T]^{3} [M]^{−2} [L]^{−2}
Inductive reactance	X_{L}	$X_L = \omega_d L \,\!$	Ω^{−1} m^{−1}	[I]^{2} [T]^{3} [M]^{−2} [L]^{−2}
AC electrical impedance	Z	$V = I Z\,\!$ $Z = \sqrt{R^2 + \left ( X_L - X_C \right )^2 } \,\!$	Ω^{−1} m^{−1}	[I]^{2} [T]^{3} [M]^{−2} [L]^{−2}
Phase constant	δ, φ	$\tan\phi= \frac{X_L - X_C}{R}\,\!$	dimensionless	dimensionless
AC peak current	I_{0}	$I_0 = I_\mathrm{rms} \sqrt{2}\,\!$	A	[I]
AC root mean square current	I_{rms}	$I_\mathrm{rms} = \sqrt{\frac{1}{T} \int_{0}^{T} \left [ I \left ( t \right ) \right ]^2 \mathrm{d} t} \,\!$	A	[I]
AC peak voltage	V_{0}	$V_0 = V_\mathrm{rms} \sqrt{2} \,\!$	V = J C^{−1}	[M] [L]^{2} [T]^{−3} [I]^{−1}
AC root mean square voltage	V_{rms}	$V_\mathrm{rms} = \sqrt{\frac{1}{T} \int_{0}^{T} \left [ V \left ( t \right ) \right ]^2 \mathrm{d} t} \,\!$	V = J C^{−1}	[M] [L]^{2} [T]^{−3} [I]^{−1}
AC emf, root mean square	$\mathcal{E}_\mathrm{rms}, \sqrt{\langle \mathcal{E} \rangle} \,\!$	$\mathcal{E}_\mathrm{rms}=\mathcal{E}_\mathrm{m}/\sqrt{2}\,\!$	V = J C^{−1}	[M] [L]^{2} [T]^{−3} [I]^{−1}
AC average power	$\langle P \rangle \,\!$	$\langle P \rangle =\mathcal{E}I_\mathrm{rms}\cos\phi\,\!$	W = J s^{−1}	[M] [L]^{2} [T]^{−3}
Capacitive time constant	τ_{C}	$\tau_C = RC\,\!$	s	[T]
Inductive time constant	τ_{L}	$\tau_L = {L\over R}\,\!$	s	[T]

=== Magnetic circuits ===
Quantity (common name/s)	(Common) symbol/s	Defining equation	SI units	Dimension
Magnetomotive force, mmf	F, $\mathcal{F}, \mathcal{M}$	$\mathcal{M} = NI$ N = number of turns of conductor	A	[I]

== Electromagnetism ==
=== Electric fields ===
Summary of electrostatic relations between electric potential, electric field and charge density. Here, $\mathbf r = \mathbf x - \mathbf{x'}$.

General Classical Equations

Physical situation	Equations
Electric potential gradient and field	$\mathbf{E} = - \nabla V$ $\Delta V = -\int_{r_1}^{r_2} \mathbf{E} \cdot d\mathbf{r}\,\!$
Point charge	$\mathbf E(\mathbf r) = {q\over 4\pi \varepsilon_0}{\hat\mathbf{r}\over{|\mathbf r|}^2} = {q\over 4\pi \varepsilon_0}{\mathbf{r}\over{|\mathbf r|}^3}\,\!$
At a point in a local array of point charges	$\mathbf E(\mathbf r) = {1\over4\pi\varepsilon_0} \sum_{i=1}^n q_i {\hat\mathbf r_i\over {|\mathbf{r_i - r}|}^2} = {1\over 4\pi\varepsilon_0} \sum_{i=1}^n q_i {\mathbf r_i\over {|\mathbf{r_i - r}|}^3}$
At a point due to a continuum of charge	$\mathbf E(\mathbf r) = \frac{1}{4\pi\varepsilon_0} \iiint \, \rho(\mathbf r') {\mathbf r'\over {|\mathbf r'|}^3} \mathrm{d}^3|\mathbf r'|$
Electrostatic torque and potential energy due to non-uniform fields and dipole moments	$\boldsymbol{\tau} = \int_V \mathrm{d} \mathbf{p} \times \mathbf{E}$ $U = - \int_V \mathrm{d} \mathbf{p} \cdot \mathbf{E}$

=== Magnetic fields and moments ===
Summary of magnetostatic relations between magnetic vector potential, magnetic field and current density. Here, $\mathbf r = \mathbf x - \mathbf{x'}$.

General classical equations

Physical situation	Equations
Magnetic potential, EM vector potential	$\mathbf{B} = \nabla \times \mathbf{A}$
Due to a magnetic moment	$\mathbf{A} = \frac{\mu_0}{4\pi}\frac{\mathbf{m}\times\mathbf{r}}{\left | \mathbf{r} \right |^3}$ $\mathbf{B}({\mathbf{r}})=\nabla\times{\mathbf{A}}=\frac{\mu_{0}}{4\pi}\left(\frac{3\mathbf{r}(\mathbf{m}\cdot\mathbf{r})}{\left | \mathbf{r} \right |^{5}}-\frac{{\mathbf{m}}}{\left | \mathbf{r} \right |^{3}}\right)$
Magnetic moment due to a current distribution	$\mathbf{m} = \frac{1}{2}\int_V \mathbf{r}\times\mathbf{J} \mathrm{d} V$
Magnetostatic torque and potential energy due to non-uniform fields and dipole moments	$\boldsymbol{\tau} = \int_V \mathrm{d} \mathbf{m} \times \mathbf{B}$ $U = - \int_V \mathrm{d} \mathbf{m} \cdot \mathbf{B}$

== Electric circuits and electronics ==
Below N = number of conductors or circuit components. Subscript net refers to the equivalent and resultant property value.

Physical situation	Nomenclature	Series	Parallel
Resistors and conductors	R_{i} = resistance of resistor or conductor i; G_{i} = conductance of resistor or conductor i	$R_\mathrm{net} = \sum_{i=1}^{N} R_i\,\!$ ${1\over G_\mathrm{net}} = \sum_{i=1}^{N} {1\over G_i}\,\!$	${1\over R_\mathrm{net}} = \sum_{i=1}^{N} {1\over R_i}\,\!$ $G_\mathrm{net} = \sum_{i=1}^{N} G_i \,\!$
Charge, capacitors, currents	C_{i} = capacitance of capacitor i; q_{i} = charge of charge carrier i	$q_\mathrm{net} = \sum_{i=1}^N q_i \,\!$ ${1\over C_\mathrm{net}} = \sum_{i=1}^N {1\over C_i} \,\!$ $I_\mathrm{net} = I_i \,\!$	$q_\mathrm{net} = \sum_{i=1}^N q_i \,\!$ $C_\mathrm{net} = \sum_{i=1}^N C_i \,\!$ $I_\mathrm{net} = \sum_{i=1}^N I_i \,\!$
Inductors	L_{i} = self-inductance of inductor i; L_{ij} = self-inductance element ij of L matrix; M_{ij} = mutual inductance between inductors i and j	$L_\mathrm{net} = \sum_{i=1}^N L_i \,\!$	${1\over L_\mathrm{net}} = \sum_{i=1}^N {1\over L_i} \,\!$ $V_i = \sum_{j=1}^N L_{ij} \frac{\mathrm{d}I_j}{\mathrm{d}t} \,\!$

Series circuit equations
Circuit	DC Circuit equations	AC Circuit equations
RC circuits	Circuit equation $R{\mathrm{d}q\over \mathrm{d}t} + {q\over C} = \mathcal{E}\,\!$ Capacitor charge $q = C\mathcal{E}\left ( 1 - e^{-t/RC} \right )\,\!$ Capacitor discharge $q = C\mathcal{E}e^{-t/RC}\,\!$	
RL circuits	Circuit equation $L{\mathrm{d}I\over \mathrm{d}t}+RI=\mathcal{E}\,\!$ Inductor current rise $I = \frac{\mathcal{E}}{R}\left ( 1-e^{-Rt/L}\right )\,\!$ Inductor current fall $I=\frac{\mathcal{E}}{R}e^{-t/\tau_L}=I_0e^{-Rt/L}\,\!$	
LC circuits	Circuit equation $L{\mathrm{d}^2q\over \mathrm{d}t^2} + {q\over C} = \mathcal{E}\,\!$	Circuit equation $L{\mathrm{d}^2q\over \mathrm{d}t^2} + {q\over C} = \mathcal{E} \sin\left(\omega_0 t + \phi \right) \,\!$ Circuit resonant frequency $\omega_\mathrm{res} = {1\over\sqrt{LC}}\,\!$ Circuit charge $q = q_0 \cos(\omega t + \phi)\,\!$ Circuit current $I=-\omega q_0 \sin(\omega t + \phi)\,\!$ Circuit electrical potential energy $U_E = {q^2\over2C} = {q_0^2\cos^2(\omega t + \phi)\over2C}\,\!$ Circuit magnetic potential energy $U_B={q_0^2\sin^2(\omega t + \phi)\over2C}\,\!$
RLC circuits	Circuit equation $L{\mathrm{d}^2q\over \mathrm{d}t^2} + R{\mathrm{d}q\over \mathrm{d}t} + {q\over C} = \mathcal{E} \,\!$	Circuit equation $L{\mathrm{d}^2q\over \mathrm{d}t^2} + R{\mathrm{d}q\over \mathrm{d}t} + {q\over C} = \mathcal{E} \sin\left(\omega_0 t + \phi \right) \,\!$ Circuit charge $q = q_0 eT^{-Rt/2L}\cos(\omega't+\phi)\,\!$

== See also ==
- Defining equation (physical chemistry)
- Fresnel equations
- Maxwell's equations
- List of equations in classical mechanics
- List of equations in fluid mechanics
- List of equations in gravitation
- List of equations in nuclear and particle physics
- List of equations in quantum mechanics
- List of equations in wave theory
- List of photonics equations
- List of relativistic equations
- SI electromagnetism units
- Table of thermodynamic equations

== Sources ==
- P.M. Whelan; M.J. Hodgeson (1978). Essential Principles of Physics (2nd ed.). John Murray. ISBN 0-7195-3382-1.
- G. Woan (2010). The Cambridge Handbook of Physics Formulas. Cambridge University Press. ISBN 978-0-521-57507-2.
- A. Halpern (1988). 3000 Solved Problems in Physics, Schaum Series. Mc Graw Hill. ISBN 978-0-07-025734-4.
- R.G. Lerner; G.L. Trigg (2005). Encyclopaedia of Physics (2nd ed.). VHC Publishers, Hans Warlimont, Springer. pp. 12–13. ISBN 978-0-07-025734-4.
- C.B. Parker (1994). McGraw Hill Encyclopaedia of Physics (2nd ed.). McGraw Hill. ISBN 0-07-051400-3.
- P.A. Tipler; G. Mosca (2008). Physics for Scientists and Engineers: With Modern Physics (6th ed.). W.H. Freeman and Co. ISBN 978-1-4292-0265-7.
- L.N. Hand; J.D. Finch (2008). Analytical Mechanics. Cambridge University Press. ISBN 978-0-521-57572-0.
- T.B. Arkill; C.J. Millar (1974). Mechanics, Vibrations and Waves. John Murray. ISBN 0-7195-2882-8.
- H.J. Pain (1983). The Physics of Vibrations and Waves (3rd ed.). John Wiley & Sons. ISBN 0-471-90182-2.
- J.R. Forshaw; A.G. Smith (2009). Dynamics and Relativity. Wiley. ISBN 978-0-470-01460-8.
- G.A.G. Bennet (1974). Electricity and Modern Physics (2nd ed.). Edward Arnold (UK). ISBN 0-7131-2459-8.
- I.S. Grant; W.R. Phillips; Manchester Physics (2008). Electromagnetism (2nd ed.). John Wiley & Sons. ISBN 978-0-471-92712-9.
- D.J. Griffiths (2007). Introduction to Electrodynamics (3rd ed.). Pearson Education, Dorling Kindersley. ISBN 978-81-7758-293-2.
