= List of equations in gravitation =

This article summarizes equations in the theory of gravitation.

== Definitions ==
=== Gravitational mass and inertia ===
A common misconception occurs between centre of mass and centre of gravity. They are defined in similar ways but are not exactly the same quantity. Centre of mass is the mathematical description of placing all the mass in the region considered to one position, centre of gravity is a real physical quantity, the point of a body where the gravitational force acts. They are equal if and only if the external gravitational field is uniform.

Quantity (common name/s)	(Common) symbol/s	Defining equation	SI units	Dimension
Centre of gravity	r_{cog} (symbols vary)	i^{th} moment of mass $\mathbf{m}_i = \mathbf{r}_i m_i \,\!$ Centre of gravity for a set of discrete masses: $$\begin{align} \mathbf{r}_\mathrm{cog} & = \frac{1}{M \left | \mathbf{g} \left ( \mathbf{r}_i \right ) \right |}\sum_i \mathbf{m}_i \left | \mathbf{g} \left ( \mathbf{r}_i \right ) \right | \\ & = \frac{1}{M \left | \mathbf{g} \left ( \mathbf{r}_\mathrm{cog} \right ) \right |}\sum_i \mathbf{r}_i m_i \left | \mathbf{g} \left ( \mathbf{r}_i \right ) \right | \end{align}\,\!$$ Centre of gravity for a continuum of mass: $$\begin{align} \mathbf{r}_\mathrm{cog} & = \frac{1}{M \left | \mathbf{g} \left ( \mathbf{r}_\mathrm{cog} \right ) \right |}\int \left | \mathbf{g} \left ( \mathbf{r} \right ) \right |\mathrm{d}\mathbf{m} \\ & = \frac{1}{M \left | \mathbf{g} \left ( \mathbf{r}_\mathrm{cog} \right ) \right |}\int \mathbf{r} \left | \mathbf{g} \left ( \mathbf{r} \right ) \right | \mathrm{d}^n m \\ & = \frac{1}{M \left | \mathbf{g} \left ( \mathbf{r}_\mathrm{cog} \right ) \right |}\int \mathbf{r} \rho_n \left | \mathbf{g} \left ( \mathbf{r} \right ) \right | \mathrm{d}^n x \end{align} \,\!$$	m	[L]
Standard gravitational parameter of a mass	μ	$\mu = Gm \,\!$	N m^{2} kg^{−1}	[L]^{3} [T]^{−2}

=== Newtonian gravitation ===
In classical gravitation, mass is the source of an attractive gravitational field g.

Gravitomagnetic field H due to (total) angular momentum J.

Interpretations of the gravitational field.

Quantity (common name/s)	(Common) symbol/s	Defining equation	SI units	Dimension
Gravitational field, field strength, potential gradient, acceleration	g	$\mathbf{g} = \mathbf{F}/m \,\!$	N kg^{−1} = m s^{−2}	[L][T]^{−2}
Gravitational flux	Φ_{G}	$\Phi_G = \int_S \mathbf{g} \cdot \mathrm{d}\mathbf{A} \,\!$	m^{3} s^{−2}	[L]^{3}[T]^{−2}
Absolute gravitational potential	Φ, φ, U, V	$U = - \frac{W_{\infty r}}{m} = - \frac{1}{m} \int_\infty^{r} \mathbf{F} \cdot \mathrm{d}\mathbf{r} = - \int_\infty^{r} \mathbf{g} \cdot \mathrm{d}\mathbf{r} \,\!$	J kg^{−1}	[L]^{2}[T]^{−2}
Gravitational potential difference	ΔΦ, Δφ, ΔU, ΔV	$\Delta U = - \frac{W}{m} = - \frac{1}{m} \int_{r_1}^{r_2} \mathbf{F} \cdot \mathrm{d}\mathbf{r} = - \int_{r_1}^{r_2} \mathbf{g} \cdot \mathrm{d}\mathbf{r} \,\!$	J kg^{−1}	[L]^{2}[T]^{−2}
Gravitational potential energy	E_{p}	$E_p = - W_{\infty r} \,\!$	J	[M][L]^{2}[T]^{−2}
Gravitational torsion field	Ω	$\boldsymbol{\Omega} = 2 \boldsymbol{\xi} \,\!$	Hz = s^{−1}	[T]^{−1}

=== Gravitoelectromagnetism ===
In the weak-field and slow motion limit of general relativity, the phenomenon of gravitoelectromagnetism (in short "GEM") occurs, creating a parallel between gravitation and electromagnetism. The gravitational field is the analogue of the electric field, while the gravitomagnetic field, which results from circulations of masses due to their angular momentum, is the analogue of the magnetic field.

Quantity (common name/s)	(Common) symbol/s	Defining equation	SI units	Dimension
Gravitational torsion flux	Φ_{Ω}	$\Phi_\Omega = \int_S \boldsymbol{\Omega} \cdot \mathrm{d}\mathbf{A} \,\!$	N m s kg^{−1} = m^{2} s^{−1}	[M]^{2} [T]^{−1}
Gravitomagnetic field	H, B_{g}, B, ξ	$\mathbf{F} = m \left ( \mathbf{v} \times 2 \boldsymbol{\xi} \right ) \,\!$	Hz = s^{−1}	[T]^{−1}
Gravitomagnetic flux	Φ_{ξ}	$\Phi_\xi = \int_S \boldsymbol{\xi} \cdot \mathrm{d}\mathbf{A} \,\!$	N m s kg^{−1} = m^{2} s^{−1}	[M]^{2} [T]^{−1}
Gravitomagnetic vector potential	h	$\mathbf{\xi} = \nabla \times \mathbf{h} \,\!$	m s^{−1}	[M] [T]^{−1}

== Equations ==
=== Newtonian gravitational fields ===
It can be shown that a uniform spherically symmetric mass distribution generates an equivalent gravitational field to a point mass, so all formulae for point masses apply to bodies which can be modelled in this way.

Physical situation	Nomenclature	Equations
Gravitational potential gradient and field	U = gravitational potential; C = curved path traversed by a mass in the field	$\mathbf{g} = - \nabla U$ $\Delta U = -\int_C \mathbf{g} \cdot d\mathbf{r}\,\!$
Point mass		$\mathbf{g} = \frac{Gm}{\left | \mathbf{r} \right |^2 }\mathbf{\hat{r}} \,\!$
At a point in a local array of point masses		$\mathbf{g} = \sum_i \mathbf{g}_i = G \sum_i \frac{m_i}{\left | \mathbf{r}_i - \mathbf{r} \right |^2}\mathbf{\hat{r}}_i \,\!$
Gravitational torque and potential energy due to non-uniform fields and mass moments	V = volume of space occupied by the mass distribution; m = mr is the mass moment of a massive particle	$\boldsymbol{\tau} = \int_{V_n} \mathrm{d} \mathbf{m} \times \mathbf{g} \,\!$ $U = \int_{V_n} \mathrm{d} \mathbf{m} \cdot \mathbf{g} \,\!$
Gravitational field for a rotating body	$\phi$ = zenith angle relative to rotation axis; $\mathbf{\hat{a}} \,\!$ = unit vector perpendicular to rotation (zenith) axis, radial from it	$\mathbf{g} = - \frac{GM}{\left | \mathbf{r} \right |^2} \mathbf{\hat{r}} - (\left | \boldsymbol{\omega} \right |^2\left | \mathbf{r} \right | \sin \phi )\mathbf{\hat{a}} \,\!$

=== Gravitational potentials ===
General classical equations.

Physical situation	Nomenclature	Equations
Potential energy from gravity, integral from Newton's law		$U = -\frac{G m_1 m_2}{\left | \mathbf{r} \right |} \approx m \left | \mathbf{g} \right | y\,\!$
Escape speed	M = Mass of body (e.g. planet) to escape from; r = radius of body	$v = \sqrt{\frac{2GM}{r}}\,\!$
Orbital energy	m = mass of orbiting body (e.g. planet); M = mass of central body (e.g. star); ω = angular velocity of orbiting mass; r = separation between centres of mass; T = kinetic energy; U = gravitational potential energy (sometimes called "gravitational binding energy" for this instance)	$$\begin{align} E & = T + U \\ & = -\frac{G m M}{\left | \mathbf{r} \right |} + \frac{1}{2} m \left | \mathbf{v} \right |^2 \\ & = m \left ( - \frac{GM}{\left | \mathbf{r} \right |} + \frac{\left | \boldsymbol{\omega} \times \mathbf{r} \right |^2}{2} \right ) \\ & = - \frac{GmM}{2 \left | \mathbf{r} \right |} \end{align} \,\!$$

=== Weak-field relativistic equations ===
Physical situation	Nomenclature	Equations
Gravitomagnetic field for a rotating body	ξ = gravitomagnetic field	$\boldsymbol{\xi} = \frac{G }{2 c^2} \frac{\mathbf{L} 3(\mathbf{L} \cdot \mathbf{\hat{r}} ) \mathbf{\hat{r}}}{\left | \mathbf{r} \right |^3}$

== See also ==
- Defining equation (physical chemistry)
- List of electromagnetism equations
- List of equations in classical mechanics
- List of equations in nuclear and particle physics
- List of equations in quantum mechanics
- List of equations in wave theory
- List of photonics equations
- List of relativistic equations
- Table of thermodynamic equations

== Sources ==
- P.M. Whelan, M.J. Hodgeson (1978). Essential Principles of Physics (2nd ed.). John Murray. ISBN 0-7195-3382-1.
- G. Woan (2010). The Cambridge Handbook of Physics Formulas. Cambridge University Press. ISBN 978-0-521-57507-2.
- A. Halpern (1988). 3000 Solved Problems in Physics, Schaum Series. Mc Graw Hill. ISBN 978-0-07-025734-4.
- R.G. Lerner, G.L. Trigg (2005). Encyclopaedia of Physics (2nd ed.). VHC Publishers, Hans Warlimont, Springer. pp. 12–13. ISBN 978-0-07-025734-4.
- C.B. Parker (1994). McGraw Hill Encyclopaedia of Physics (2nd ed.). McGraw Hill. ISBN 0-07-051400-3.
- P.A. Tipler, G. Mosca (2008). Physics for Scientists and Engineers: With Modern Physics (6th ed.). W.H. Freeman and Co. ISBN 978-1-4292-0265-7.
- L.N. Hand, J.D. Finch (2008). Analytical Mechanics. Cambridge University Press. ISBN 978-0-521-57572-0.
- T.B. Arkill, C.J. Millar (1974). Mechanics, Vibrations and Waves. John Murray. ISBN 0-7195-2882-8.
- J.R. Forshaw, A.G. Smith (2009). Dynamics and Relativity. Wiley. ISBN 978-0-470-01460-8.
