= Defining equation =

Defining equation may refer to:

- Defining equation (physical chemistry)

== See also ==
- Physical quantity
