= List of relativistic equations =

Following is a list of the frequently occurring equations in the theory of special relativity.

== Postulates of Special Relativity ==
To derive the equations of special relativity, one must start with two other

1. The laws of physics are invariant under transformations between inertial frames. In other words, the laws of physics will be the same whether you are testing them in a frame 'at rest', or a frame moving with a constant velocity relative to the 'rest' frame.
2. The speed of light in a perfect classical vacuum ($c_0$) is measured to be the same by all observers in inertial frames and is, moreover, finite but nonzero. This speed acts as a supremum for the speed of local transmission of information in the universe.

In this context, "speed of light" really refers to the speed supremum of information transmission or of the movement of ordinary (nonnegative mass) matter, locally, as in a classical vacuum. Thus, a more accurate description would refer to $c_0$ rather than the speed of light per se. However, light and other massless particles do theoretically travel at $c_0$ under vacuum conditions and experiment has nonfalsified this notion with fairly high precision. Regardless of whether light itself does travel at $c_0$, though $c_0$ does act as such a supremum, and that is the assumption which matters for Relativity.

From these two postulates, all of special relativity follows.

In the following, the relative velocity v between two inertial frames is restricted fully to the x-direction, of a Cartesian coordinate system.

== Kinematics ==
=== Lorentz transformation ===
The following notations are used very often in special relativity:

Lorentz factor

$$\gamma = \frac{1}{\sqrt{1 - \beta^2}}$$

where $\beta= \frac{v}{c}$ and v is the relative velocity between two inertial frames.

For two frames at rest, γ = 1, and increases with relative velocity between the two inertial frames. As the relative velocity approaches the speed of light, γ → ∞.

Time dilation (different times t and t' at the same position x in same inertial frame)

$$t' = \gamma t$$

Derivation of time dilation

Applying the above postulates, consider the inside of any vehicle (usually exemplified by a train) moving with a velocity v with respect to someone standing on the ground as the vehicle passes. Inside, a light is shone upwards to a mirror on the ceiling, where the light reflects back down. If the height of the mirror is h, and the speed of light c, then the time it takes for the light to go up and come back down is:

$$t = \frac{2h}{c}$$

However, to the observer on the ground, the situation is very different. Since the train is moving by the observer on the ground, the light beam appears to move diagonally instead of straight up and down. To visualize this, picture the light being emitted at one point, then having the vehicle move until the light hits the mirror at the top of the vehicle, and then having the train move still more until the light beam returns to the bottom of the vehicle. The light beam will have appeared to have moved diagonally upward with the train, and then diagonally downward. This path will help form two-right sided triangles, with the height as one of the sides, and the two straight parts of the path being the respective hypotenuses:

$$c^2 \left(\frac{t'}{2}\right)^2 = h^2 + v^2 \left(\frac{t'}{2}\right)^2$$

Rearranging to get $t'$:

$$\left ( \frac{t'}{2} \right )^2 = \frac{h^2}{c^2 - v^2}$$
$$\frac{t'}{2} = \frac{h}{\sqrt{c^2 - v^2}}$$
$$t' = \frac{2h}{\sqrt{c^2 - v^2}}$$

Taking out a factor of c, and then plugging in for t, one finds:

$$t' = \frac{2h}c \frac{1}{\sqrt{1 - \frac{v^2}{c^2}}} = \frac{t}{\sqrt{1 - \frac{v^2}{c^2}}}$$

This is the formula for time dilation:

$$t' = \gamma t$$

In this example the time measured in the frame on the vehicle, t, is known as the proper time. The proper time between two events - such as the event of light being emitted on the vehicle and the event of light being received on the vehicle - is the time between the two events in a frame where the events occur at the same location. So, above, the emission and reception of the light both took place in the vehicle's frame, making the time that an observer in the vehicle's frame would measure the proper time.

Length contraction (different positions x and x' at the same instant t in the same inertial frame)

$$\ell' = \frac{\ell}{\gamma}$$

Derivation of length contraction

Consider a long train, moving with velocity v with respect to the ground, and one observer on the train and one on the ground, standing next to a post. The observer on the train sees the front of the train pass the post, and then, some time t′ later, sees the end of the train pass the same post. He then calculates the train's length as follows:

$$\ell = v t' \,$$

However, the observer on the ground, making the same measurement, comes to a different conclusion. This observer finds that time t passed between the front of the train passing the post, and the back of the train passing the post. Because the two events - the passing of each end of the train by the post - occurred in the same place in the ground observer's frame, the time this observer measured is the proper time. So:

$$\ell' = v t = v \left ( \frac{t'}{\gamma} \right ) = \frac{\ell}{\gamma}$$

This is the formula for length contraction. As there existed a proper time for time dilation, there exists a proper length for length contraction, which in this case is ℓ. The proper length of an object is the length of the object in the frame in which the object is at rest. Also, this contraction only affects the dimensions of the object which are parallel to the relative velocity between the object and observer. Thus, lengths perpendicular to the direction of motion are unaffected by length contraction.

Lorentz transformation

$$x' = \gamma \left ( x - v t \right )$$
$$y' = y \,$$
$$z' = z \,$$
$$t' = \gamma \left ( t - \frac{v x}{c^2} \right )$$

Derivation of Lorentz transformation using time dilation and length contraction

Now substituting the length contraction result into the Galilean transformation (i.e. x = ℓ), we have:

$$\frac{x'}{\gamma} = x - v t$$

that is:

$$x' = \gamma \left ( x - v t \right )$$

and going from the primed frame to the unprimed frame:

$$x = \gamma \left ( x' + v t' \right )$$

Going from the primed frame to the unprimed frame was accomplished by making v in the first equation negative, and then exchanging primed variables for unprimed ones, and vice versa. Also, as length contraction does not affect the perpendicular dimensions of an object, the following remain the same as in the Galilean transformation:

$$y' = y \,$$
$$z' = z \,$$

Finally, to determine how t and t′ transform, substituting the x↔x′ transformation into its inverse:

$$x = \gamma \left ( \gamma \left ( x - v t \right ) + v t' \right )$$
$$x = \gamma \left ( \gamma x - \gamma v t + v t' \right )$$
$$x = \gamma^2 x - \gamma^2 v t + \gamma v t' \,$$
$$\gamma v t' = \gamma^2 v t - \gamma^2 x + x \,$$
$$\gamma v t' = \gamma^2 v t + x \left ( 1 - \gamma^2 \right )$$

Plugging in the value for γ:

$$\gamma v t' = \gamma^2 v t + x \left ( 1 - \frac{1}{1-\beta^2} \right )$$
$$\gamma v t' = \gamma^2 v t + x \left ( \frac{1 - \beta^2}{1 - \beta^2} - \frac{1}{1-\beta^2} \right )$$
$$\gamma v t' = \gamma^2 v t - x \left ( \frac{\beta^2}{1-\beta^2} \right )$$
$$\gamma v t' = \gamma^2 v t - \gamma^2 \beta^2 x \,$$

Finally, dividing through by γv:

$$t' = \gamma \left ( t - \beta \frac{x}{c} \right )$$

Or more commonly:

$$t' = \gamma \left ( t - \frac{v x}{c^2} \right )$$

And the converse can again be gotten by changing the sign of v, and exchanging the unprimed variables for their primed variables, and vice versa. These transformations together are the Lorentz transformation:

$$x' = \gamma \left ( x - v t \right )$$
$$y' = y \,$$
$$z' = z \,$$
$$t' = \gamma \left ( t - \frac{v x}{c^2} \right )$$

Velocity addition

$$V'_x=\frac{ V_x - v }{ 1 - \frac{V_x v}{c^2} }$$

$$V'_y=\frac{ V_y }{ \gamma \left ( 1 - \frac{V_x v}{c^2} \right ) }$$

$$V'_z=\frac{ V_z }{ \gamma \left ( 1 - \frac{V_x v}{c^2} \right ) }$$

Derivation of velocity addition

The Lorentz transformations also apply to differentials, so:

$$dx' = \gamma \left ( dx - v dt \right )$$
$$dy' = dy \,$$
$$dz' = dz \,$$
$$dt' = \gamma \left ( dt - \frac{v dx}{c^2} \right )$$

The velocity is dx/dt, so

$$\frac{dx'}{dt'}=\frac{ \gamma \left ( dx - v dt \right ) }{ \gamma \left ( dt - \frac{v dx}{c^2} \right ) }$$
$$\frac{dx'}{dt'}=\frac{ dx - v dt }{ dt - \frac{v dx}{c^2} }$$
$$\frac{dx'}{dt'}=\frac{ \frac{dx}{dt} - v }{ 1 - \frac{dx}{dt} \frac{v}{c^2} }$$

Now substituting:

$$V_x = \frac{dx}{dt}\,\quad V'_x = \frac{dx'}{dt'}$$

gives the velocity addition (actually below is subtraction, addition is just reversing the signs of V_{x}, V_{y}, and V_{z} around):

$$V'_x=\frac{ V_x - v }{ 1 - \frac{V_x v}{c^2} }$$
$$V'_y=\frac{ V_y }{ \gamma \left ( 1 - \frac{V_x v}{c^2} \right ) }$$
$$V'_z=\frac{ V_z }{ \gamma \left ( 1 - \frac{V_x v}{c^2} \right ) }$$

Also, the velocities in the directions perpendicular to the frame changes are affected, as shown above. This is due to time dilation, as encapsulated in the dt/dt′ transformation. The V′_{y} and V′_{z} equations were both derived by dividing the appropriate space differential (e.g. dy′ or dz′) by the time differential.

== The metric and four-vectors ==
In what follows, bold sans serif is used for 4-vectors while normal bold roman is used for ordinary 3-vectors.

Inner product (i.e. notion of length)

$$\boldsymbol{\mathsf{a}} \cdot \boldsymbol{\mathsf{b}} =\eta (\boldsymbol{\mathsf{a}} , \boldsymbol{\mathsf{b}})$$

where $\eta$ is known as the metric tensor. In special relativity, the metric tensor is the Minkowski metric:

$$\eta = \begin{pmatrix} -1 & 0 & 0 & 0 \\ 0  & 1 & 0 & 0 \\ 0 & 0 & 1 & 0 \\ 0 & 0 & 0 & 1 \end{pmatrix}$$

Space-time interval

$$ds^2 = dx^2 + dy^2 + dz^2 - c^2 dt^2 = \begin{pmatrix} cdt & dx & dy & dz \end{pmatrix} \begin{pmatrix} -1 & 0 & 0 & 0 \\ 0  & 1 & 0 & 0 \\ 0 & 0 & 1 & 0 \\ 0 & 0 & 0 & 1 \end{pmatrix} \begin{pmatrix} cdt \\ dx \\ dy \\ dz \end{pmatrix}$$

In the above, ds^{2} is known as the spacetime interval. This inner product is invariant under the Lorentz transformation, that is,

$$\eta ( \boldsymbol{\mathsf{a}}' , \boldsymbol{\mathsf{b}}' ) = \eta \left ( \Lambda \boldsymbol{\mathsf{a}} , \Lambda \boldsymbol{\mathsf{b}} \right ) = \eta ( \boldsymbol{\mathsf{a}} , \boldsymbol{\mathsf{b}} )$$

The sign of the metric and the placement of the ct, ct', cdt, and cdt′ time-based terms can vary depending on the author's choice. For instance, many times the time-based terms are placed first in the four-vectors, with the spatial terms following. Also, sometimes η is replaced with −η, making the spatial terms produce negative contributions to the dot product or spacetime interval, while the time term makes a positive contribution. These differences can be used in any combination, so long as the choice of standards is followed completely throughout the computations performed.

=== Lorentz transforms ===
It is possible to express the above coordinate transformation via a matrix. To simplify things, it can be best to replace t, t′, dt, and dt′ with ct, ct', cdt, and cdt′, which has the dimensions of distance. So:

$$x' = \gamma x - \gamma \beta c t \,$$
$$y' = y \,$$
$$z' = z \,$$
$$c t' = \gamma c t - \gamma \beta x \,$$

then in matrix form:

$$\begin{pmatrix} c t' \\ x' \\ y' \\ z' \end{pmatrix} = \begin{pmatrix} \gamma & - \gamma \beta & 0 & 0 \\ - \gamma \beta & \gamma & 0 & 0\\ 0 & 0 & 1 & 0 \\ 0 & 0 & 0 & 1  \end{pmatrix}\begin{pmatrix} c t \\ x \\ y \\ z \end{pmatrix}$$

The vectors in the above transformation equation are known as four-vectors, in this case they are specifically the position four-vectors. In general, in special relativity, four-vectors can be transformed from one reference frame to another as follows:

$$\boldsymbol{\mathsf{a}}' = \Lambda \boldsymbol{\mathsf{a}}$$

In the above, $\boldsymbol{\mathsf{a}}'$ and $\boldsymbol{\mathsf{a}}$ are the four-vector and the transformed four-vector, respectively, and Λ is the transformation matrix, which, for a given transformation is the same for all four-vectors one might want to transform. So $\boldsymbol{\mathsf{a}}'$ can be a four-vector representing position, velocity, or momentum, and the same Λ can be used when transforming between the same two frames. The most general Lorentz transformation includes boosts and rotations; the components are complicated and the transformation requires spinors.

=== 4-vectors and frame-invariant results ===
Invariance and unification of physical quantities both arise from four-vectors. The inner product of a 4-vector with itself is equal to a scalar (by definition of the inner product), and since the 4-vectors are physical quantities their magnitudes correspond to physical quantities also.

Property/effect	3-vector	4-vector	Invariant result
Space-time events	3-position: r = (x_{1}, x_{2}, x_{3}) $\mathbf{r} \cdot \mathbf{r} \equiv r^2 \equiv x_1^2 + x_2^2 + x_3^2 \,\!$	4-position: X = (ct, x_{1}, x_{2}, x_{3})	$\boldsymbol{\mathsf{X}} \cdot \boldsymbol{\mathsf{X}} = \left ( c \tau \right )^2 \,\!$ $$\begin{align} & \left ( c t \right )^2 - \left ( x_1^2 + x_2^2 + x_3^2 \right ) \\ & = \left ( c t \right )^2 - r^2 \\ & = -\chi^2 = \left ( c\tau \right )^2 \end{align} \,\!$$ τ = proper time χ = proper distance
Momentum-energy invariance	$\mathbf{p} = \gamma m\mathbf{u} \,\!$ 3-momentum: p = (p_{1}, p_{2}, p_{3}) $\mathbf{p} \cdot \mathbf{p} \equiv p^2 \equiv p_1^2 + p_2^2 + p_3^2 \,\!$	4-momentum: P = (E/c, p_{1}, p_{2}, p_{3}) $\boldsymbol{\mathsf{P}} = m \boldsymbol{\mathsf{U}} \,\!$	$\boldsymbol{\mathsf{P}} \cdot \boldsymbol{\mathsf{P}} = \left ( m c \right )^2 \,\!$ $$\begin{align} & \left ( \frac{E}{c} \right )^2 - \left ( p_1^2 + p_2^2 + p_3^2 \right ) \\ & = \left ( \frac{E}{c} \right )^2 - p^2 \\ & = \left ( mc \right )^2 \end{align} \,\!$$ which leads to: $E^2 = \left ( pc \right )^2 + \left ( mc^2 \right )^2 \,\!$ E = total energy m = invariant mass
Velocity	3-velocity: u = (u_{1}, u_{2}, u_{3}) $\mathbf{u} = \frac{\mathrm{d}\mathbf{r}}{\mathrm{d}t} \,\!$	4-velocity: U = (U_{0}, U_{1}, U_{2}, U_{3}) $\boldsymbol{\mathsf{U}} =\frac{\mathrm{d}\boldsymbol{\mathsf{X}} }{\mathrm{d} \tau} = \gamma \left( c, \mathbf{u} \right)$	$\boldsymbol{\mathsf{U}} \cdot \boldsymbol{\mathsf{U}} = c^2 \,\!$
Acceleration	3-acceleration: a = (a_{1}, a_{2}, a_{3}) $\mathbf{a} = \frac{\mathrm{d}\mathbf{u}}{\mathrm{d}t} \,\!$	4-acceleration: A = (A_{0}, A_{1}, A_{2}, A_{3}) $\boldsymbol{\mathsf{A}} =\frac{\mathrm{d}\boldsymbol{\mathsf{U}} }{\mathrm{d} \tau} = \gamma \left( c\frac{\mathrm{d}\gamma}{\mathrm{d}t}, \frac{\mathrm{d}\gamma}{\mathrm{d}t} \mathbf{u} + \gamma \mathbf{a} \right)$	$\boldsymbol{\mathsf{A}} \cdot \boldsymbol{\mathsf{U}} = 0 \,\!$
Force	3-force: f = (f_{1}, f_{2}, f_{3}) $\mathbf{f} = \frac{\mathrm{d}\mathbf{p}}{\mathrm{d}t} \,\!$	4-force: F = (F_{0}, F_{1}, F_{2}, F_{3}) $\boldsymbol{\mathsf{F}} =\frac{\mathrm{d}\boldsymbol{\mathsf{P}} }{\mathrm{d} \tau} = \gamma m \left( c\frac{\mathrm{d}\gamma}{\mathrm{d}t}, \frac{\mathrm{d}\gamma}{\mathrm{d}t} \mathbf{u} + \gamma \mathbf{a} \right)$	$\boldsymbol{\mathsf{F}} \cdot \boldsymbol{\mathsf{U}} = 0 \,\!$

== Doppler shift ==
General doppler shift:

$$\nu' = \gamma \nu \left ( 1 - \beta \cos \theta \right )$$

Doppler shift for emitter and observer moving right towards each other (or directly away):

$$\nu' = \nu \frac{\sqrt{1 - \beta}}{\sqrt{1 + \beta}}$$

Doppler shift for emitter and observer moving in a direction perpendicular to the line connecting them:

$$\nu' = \gamma \nu$$

Derivation of the relativistic Doppler shift

If an object emits a beam of light or radiation, the frequency, wavelength, and energy of that light or radiation will look different to a moving observer than to one at rest with respect to the emitter. If one assumes that the observer is moving with respect to the emitter along the x-axis, then the standard Lorentz transformation of the four-momentum, which includes energy, becomes:

$$\begin{pmatrix} \frac{E'}{c} \\ p'_x \\ p'_y \\ p'_z \end{pmatrix} = \begin{pmatrix} \gamma & - \gamma \beta & 0 & 0 \\ - \gamma \beta & \gamma & 0 & 0 \\ 0 & 0 & 1 & 0 \\ 0 & 0 & 0 & 1  \end{pmatrix} \begin{pmatrix} \frac{E}{c} \\ p_x \\ p_y \\ p_z \end{pmatrix}$$
$$\frac{E'}{c} = \gamma \frac{E}{c} - \gamma \beta p_x$$

Now, if

$$p_x = \| p \| \cos \theta$$

where θ is the angle between p_{x} and $\vec p$, and plugging in the formulas for frequency's relation to momentum and energy:

$$\frac{h \nu'}{c} = \gamma \frac{h \nu}{c} - \gamma \beta \left \Vert p \right \| \cos \theta = \gamma \frac{h \nu}{c} - \gamma \beta \frac{h \nu}{c} \cos \theta$$
$$\nu' = \gamma \nu - \gamma \beta \nu \cos \theta = \gamma \nu \left ( 1 - \beta \cos \theta \right )$$

This is the formula for the relativistic doppler shift where the difference in velocity between the emitter and observer is not on the x-axis. There are two special cases of this equation. The first is the case where the velocity between the emitter and observer is along the x-axis. In that case θ = 0, and cos θ = 1, which gives:

$$\begin{align}
\nu' & = \gamma \nu \left ( 1 - \beta \right )\\
& = \nu \frac{1}{\sqrt{1 - \beta^2}} \left ( 1 - \beta \right ) \\
& = \nu \frac{1}{\sqrt{\left ( 1 - \beta \right ) \left ( 1 + \beta \right ) }} \left ( 1 - \beta \right ) \\
& = \nu \frac{\sqrt{1 - \beta}}{\sqrt{1 + \beta}}
\end{align}$$

This is the equation for doppler shift in the case where the velocity between the emitter and observer is along the x-axis. The second special case is that where the relative velocity is perpendicular to the x-axis, and thus θ = π/2, and cos θ = 0, which gives:

$$\nu' = \gamma \nu$$

This is actually completely analogous to time dilation, as frequency is the reciprocal of time. So, doppler shift for emitters and observers moving perpendicular to the line connecting them is completely due to the effects of time dilation.

== See also ==
- Theory of relativity
- Special relativity
- General relativity
- List of physics formulae
- Defining equation (physical chemistry)
- Constitutive equation
- List of equations in classical mechanics
- Table of thermodynamic equations
- List of equations in wave theory
- List of equations in gravitation
- List of electromagnetism equations
- List of photonics equations
- List of equations in nuclear and particle physics

== Sources ==
- Encyclopaedia of Physics (2nd Edition), R.G. Lerner, G.L. Trigg, VHC publishers, 1991, (Verlagsgesellschaft) 3-527-26954-1, (VHC Inc.) 0-89573-752-3
- Dynamics and Relativity, J.R. Forshaw, A.G. Smith, Wiley, 2009, ISBN 978-0-470-01460-8
- Relativity DeMystified, D. McMahon, Mc Graw Hill (USA), 2006, ISBN 0-07-145545-0
- The Cambridge Handbook of Physics Formulas, G. Woan, Cambridge University Press, 2010, ISBN 978-0-521-57507-2.
- An Introduction to Mechanics, D. Kleppner, R.J. Kolenkow, Cambridge University Press, 2010, ISBN 978-0-521-19821-9
