= List of equations in wave theory =

This article summarizes equations in the theory of waves.

== Definitions ==
=== General fundamental quantities ===
A wave can be longitudinal where the oscillations are parallel (or antiparallel) to the propagation direction, or transverse where the oscillations are perpendicular to the propagation direction. These oscillations are characterized by a periodically time-varying displacement in the parallel or perpendicular direction, and so the instantaneous velocity and acceleration are also periodic and time varying in these directions. (the apparent motion of the wave due to the successive oscillations of particles or fields about their equilibrium positions) propagates at the phase and group velocities parallel or antiparallel to the propagation direction, which is common to longitudinal and transverse waves. Below oscillatory displacement, velocity and acceleration refer to the kinematics in the oscillating directions of the wave - transverse or longitudinal (mathematical description is identical), the group and phase velocities are separate.

Quantity (common name/s)	(Common) symbol/s	SI units	Dimension
Number of wave cycles	N	dimensionless	dimensionless
(Oscillatory) displacement	Symbol of any quantity which varies periodically, such as h, x, y (mechanical waves), x, s, η (longitudinal waves) I, V, E, B, H, D (electromagnetism), u, U (luminal waves), ψ, Ψ, Φ (quantum mechanics). Most general purposes use y, ψ, Ψ. For generality here, A is used and can be replaced by any other symbol, since others have specific, common uses. $\mathbf{A} = A \mathbf{\hat{e}}_{\parallel} \,\!$ for longitudinal waves, $\mathbf{A} = A \mathbf{\hat{e}}_{\bot} \,\!$ for transverse waves.	m	[L]
(Oscillatory) displacement amplitude	Any quantity symbol typically subscripted with 0, m or max, or the capitalized letter (if displacement was in lower case). Here for generality A_{0} is used and can be replaced.	m	[L]
(Oscillatory) velocity amplitude	V, v_{0}, v_{m}. Here v_{0} is used.	m s^{−1}	[L][T]^{−1}
(Oscillatory) acceleration amplitude	A, a_{0}, a_{m}. Here a_{0} is used.	m s^{−2}	[L][T]^{−2}
Spatial position Position of a point in space, not necessarily a point on the wave profile or any line of propagation	d, r	m	[L]
Wave profile displacement Along propagation direction, distance travelled (path length) by one wave from the source point r_{0} to any point in space d (for longitudinal or transverse waves)	L, d, r $\mathbf{r} \equiv r \mathbf{\hat{e}}_{\parallel} \equiv \mathbf{d} - \mathbf{r}_0 \,\!$	m	[L]
Phase angle	δ, ε, φ	rad	dimensionless

=== General derived quantities ===
Quantity (common name/s)	(Common) symbol/s	Defining equation	SI units	Dimension
Wavelength	λ	General definition (allows for FM): $\lambda = \mathrm{d} r/\mathrm{d} N \,\!$ For non-FM waves this reduces to: $\lambda = \Delta r/\Delta N \,\!$	m	[L]
Wavenumber, k-vector, Wave vector	k, σ	Two definitions are in use: $\mathbf{k} = \left ( 2\pi/\lambda \right ) \mathbf{\hat{e}}_{\angle} \,\!$ $\mathbf{k} = \left ( 1/\lambda \right ) \mathbf{\hat{e}}_{\angle} \,\!$	m^{−1}	[L]^{−1}
Frequency	f, ν	General definition (allows for FM): $f = \mathrm{d} N/\mathrm{d} t \,\!$ For non-FM waves this reduces to: $f = \Delta N/\Delta t \,\!$ In practice N is set to 1 cycle and t = T = time period for 1 cycle, to obtain the more useful relation: $f = 1/T \,\!$	Hz = s^{−1}	[T]^{−1}
Angular frequency/ pulsatance	ω	$\omega = 2\pi f = 2\pi / T \,\!$	Hz = s^{−1}	[T]^{−1}
Oscillatory velocity	v, v_{t}, v	Longitudinal waves: $\mathbf{v} = \mathbf{\hat{e}}_{\parallel} \left ( \partial A/\partial t \right ) \,\!$ Transverse waves: $\mathbf{v} = \mathbf{\hat{e}}_{\bot} \left ( \partial A/\partial t \right ) \,\!$	m s^{−1}	[L][T]^{−1}
Oscillatory acceleration	a, a_{t}	Longitudinal waves: $\mathbf{a} = \mathbf{\hat{e}}_{\parallel} \left ( \partial^2 A/\partial t^2 \right ) \,\!$ Transverse waves: $\mathbf{a} = \mathbf{\hat{e}}_{\bot} \left ( \partial^2 A/\partial t^2 \right ) \,\!$	m s^{−2}	[L][T]^{−2}
Path length difference between two waves	L, ΔL, Δx, Δr	$\mathbf{r} = \mathbf{r}_2 - \mathbf{r}_1 \,\!$	m	[L]
Phase velocity	v_{p}	General definition: $\mathbf{v}_\mathrm{p} = \mathbf{\hat{e}}_{\parallel} \left ( \Delta r /\Delta t \right ) \,\!$ In practice reduces to the useful form: $\mathbf{v}_\mathrm{p} = \lambda f \mathbf{\hat{e}}_{\parallel} = \left ( \omega/k \right ) \mathbf{\hat{e}}_{\parallel} \,\!$	m s^{−1}	[L][T]^{−1}
(Longitudinal) group velocity	v_{g}	$\mathbf{v}_\mathrm{g} = \mathbf{\hat{e}}_{\parallel} \left ( \partial \omega /\partial k \right ) \,\!$	m s^{−1}	[L][T]^{−1}
Time delay, time lag/lead	Δt	$\Delta t = t_2 - t_1 \,\!$	s	[T]
Phase difference	δ, Δε, Δϕ	$\Delta \phi = \phi_2 - \phi_1 \,\!$	rad	dimensionless
Phase	No standard symbol	$\mathbf{k} \cdot \mathbf{r} \mp \omega t + \phi= 2\pi N \,\!$ Physically; upper sign: wave propagation in +r direction lower sign: wave propagation in −r direction Phase angle can lag if: ϕ > 0 or lead if: ϕ < 0.	rad	dimensionless

Relation between space, time, angle analogues used to describe the phase:

$\frac{\Delta r}{\lambda} = \frac{\Delta t}{T} = \frac{\phi}{2\pi} \,\!$

=== Modulation indices ===
Quantity (common name/s)	(Common) symbol/s	Defining equation	SI units	Dimension
AM index:	h, h_{AM}	$h_{AM} = A/A_m \,\!$ A = carrier amplitude A_{m} = peak amplitude of a component in the modulating signal	dimensionless	dimensionless
FM index:	h_{FM}	$h_{FM} = \Delta f/f_m \,\!$ Δf = max. deviation of the instantaneous frequency from the carrier frequency f_{m} = peak frequency of a component in the modulating signal	dimensionless	dimensionless
PM index:	h_{PM}	$h_{PM} = \Delta \phi \,\!$ Δϕ = peak phase deviation	dimensionless	dimensionless

=== Acoustics ===
Quantity (common name/s)	(Common) symbol/s	Defining equation	SI units	Dimension
Acoustic impedance	Z	$Z = \rho v\,\!$ v = speed of sound, ρ = volume density of medium	kg m^{−2} s^{−1}	[M] [L]^{−2} [T]^{−1}
Specific acoustic impedance	z	$z = ZS\,\!$ S = surface area	kg s^{−1}	[M] [T]^{−1}
Sound Level	β	$\beta = \left ( \mathrm{dB} \right ) 10 \log \left | \frac{I}{I_0} \right | \,\!$	dimensionless	dimensionless

== Equations ==
In what follows n, m are any integers (Z = set of integers); $n, m \in \mathbf{Z} \,\!$.

=== Standing waves ===
Physical situation	Nomenclature	Equations
Harmonic frequencies	f_{n} = nth mode of vibration, nth harmonic, (n-1)th overtone	$f_n = \frac{v}{\lambda_n} = \frac{nv}{2L} = n f_1\,\!$

=== Propagating waves ===
==== Sound waves ====
Physical situation	Nomenclature	Equations
Average wave power	P_{0} = Sound power due to source	$\langle P \rangle = \mu v \omega^2 x_m^2/2\,\!$
Sound intensity	Ω = Solid angle	$I = P_0/(\Omega r^2)\,\!$ $I = P/A = \rho v \omega^2 s^2_m/2\,\!$
Acoustic beat frequency	f_{1}, f_{2} = frequencies of two waves (nearly equal amplitudes)	$f_\mathrm{beat} = \left | f_2 - f_1 \right | \,\!$
Doppler effect for mechanical waves	V = speed of sound wave in medium; f_{0} = Source frequency; f_{r} = Receiver frequency; v_{0} = Source velocity; v_{r} = Receiver velocity	$f_r = f_0 \frac{V \pm v_r}{V \mp v_0}\,\!$ upper signs indicate relative approach, lower signs indicate relative recession.
Mach cone angle (Supersonic shockwave, sonic boom)	v = speed of body; v_{s}/c = local speed of sound; θ = angle between direction of travel and conic envelope of superimposed wavefronts; M = Mach Number	$\sin \theta = \frac{v_s}{v}\,\!=\frac{1}{M}\,\!$
Acoustic pressure and displacement amplitudes	p_{0} = pressure amplitude; s_{0} = displacement amplitude; v = speed of sound; ρ = local density of medium	$p_0 = \left ( v \rho \omega \right ) s_0\,\!$
Wave functions for sound		Acoustic beats $s = \left [ 2 s_0 \cos \left ( \omega' t \right ) \right ] \cos \left ( \omega t \right )\,\!$ Sound displacement function $s = s_0\cos(k r - \omega t)\,\!$ Sound pressure-variation $p = p_0 \sin(k r - \omega t)\,\!$

==== Gravitational waves ====
Gravitational radiation for two orbiting bodies in the low-speed limit.

Physical situation	Nomenclature	Equations
Radiated power	P = Radiated power from system, t = time, r = separation between centres-of-mass; m_{1}, m_{2} = masses of the orbiting bodies	$P = \frac{\mathrm{d}E}{\mathrm{d}t} = - \frac{32}{5}\, \frac{G^4}{c^5}\, \frac{(m_1m_2)^2 (m_1+m_2)}{r^5}$
Orbital radius decay		$\frac{\mathrm{d}r}{\mathrm{d}t} = - \frac{64}{5} \frac{G^3}{c^5} \frac{(m_1m_2)(m_1+m_2)}{r^3}\$
Orbital lifetime	r_{0} = initial distance between the orbiting bodies	$t = \frac{5}{256} \frac{c^5}{G^3} \frac{r_0^4}{(m_1m_2)(m_1+m_2)}\$

=== Superposition, interference, and diffraction ===
Physical situation	Nomenclature	Equations
Principle of superposition	N = number of waves	$y_\mathrm{net} = \sum_{i=1}^N y_i \,\!$
Resonance	ω_{d} = driving angular frequency (external agent); ω_{nat} = natural angular frequency (oscillator)	$\omega_d = \omega_\mathrm{nat} \,\!$
Phase and interference	Δr = path length difference; φ = phase difference between any two successive wave cycles	$\frac{\Delta r}{\lambda} = \frac{\Delta t}{T} = \frac{\phi}{2\pi} \,\!$ Constructive interference $n = \frac{\lambda}{\Delta x}\,\!$ Destructive interference $n+\frac{1}{2} = \frac{\lambda}{\Delta x}\,\!$

=== Wave propagation ===
A common misconception occurs between phase velocity and group velocity (analogous to centres of mass and gravity). They happen to be equal in non-dispersive media. In dispersive media the phase velocity is not necessarily the same as the group velocity. The phase velocity varies with frequency.

The phase velocity is the rate at which the phase of the wave propagates in space.
The group velocity is the rate at which the wave envelope, i.e. the changes in amplitude, propagates. The wave envelope is the profile of the wave amplitudes; all transverse displacements are bound by the envelope profile.

Intuitively the wave envelope is the "global profile" of the wave, which "contains" changing "local profiles inside the global profile". Each propagates at generally different speeds determined by the important function called the dispersion relation. The use of the explicit form ω(k) is standard, since the phase velocity ω/k and the group velocity dω/dk usually have convenient representations by this function.

Physical situation	Nomenclature	Equations
Idealized non-dispersive media	p = (any type of) Stress or Pressure, ρ = Volume Mass Density, F = Tension Force, μ = Linear Mass Density of medium	$v = \sqrt{\frac{p}{\rho}} = \sqrt{\frac{F}{\mu}} \,\!$
Dispersion relation		Implicit form $D \left ( \omega, k \right ) = 0$ Explicit form $\omega = \omega \left ( k \right )$
Amplitude modulation, AM		$A = A \left ( t \right )$
Frequency modulation, FM		$f = f \left ( t \right )$

=== General wave functions ===
==== Wave equations ====
Physical situation	Nomenclature	Wave equation	General solution/s
Non-dispersive Wave Equation in 3d	A = amplitude as function of position and time	$\nabla^2 A = \frac{1}{v_{\parallel}^2} \frac{\partial ^2 A}{\partial t^2}\,\!$	$A \left ( \mathbf{r}, t \right ) = A \left ( x - v_{\parallel} t \right ) \,\!$
Exponentially damped waveform	A_{0} = Initial amplitude at time t = 0; b = damping parameter		$A = A_0 e^{-bt} \sin \left ( k x - \omega t + \phi \right ) \,\!$
Korteweg–de Vries equation	α = constant	$\frac{\partial y}{\partial t} + \alpha y \frac{\partial y}{\partial x} + \frac{\partial^3 y}{\partial x^3} = 0 \,\!$	$A(x,t) = \frac{3v_{\parallel}}{\alpha} \mathrm{sech}^2 \left [ \frac{\sqrt{v_{\parallel}}}{2} \left ( x-v_{\parallel} t \right ) \right ] \,\!$

==== Sinusoidal solutions to the 3d wave equation ====
N different sinusoidal waves

Complex amplitude of wave n
$A_n = \left | A_n \right | e^{i \left ( \mathbf{k}_\mathrm{n}\cdot\mathbf{r} - \omega_n t + \phi_n \right )} \,\!$

Resultant complex amplitude of all N waves
$A = \sum_{n=1}^{N} A_n \,\!$

Modulus of amplitude
$A = \sqrt{AA^{*}} = \sqrt{\sum_{n=1}^N \sum_{m=1}^N \left | A_n \right | \left | A_m \right | \cos \left [ \left ( \mathbf{k}_n - \mathbf{k}_m \right ) \cdot \mathbf{r} + \left ( \omega_n - \omega_m \right ) t + \left ( \phi_n - \phi_m \right ) \right ]} \,\!$

The transverse displacements are simply the real parts of the complex amplitudes.

1-dimensional corollaries for two sinusoidal waves

The following may be deduced by applying the principle of superposition to two sinusoidal waves, using trigonometric identities. The angle addition and sum-to-product trigonometric formulae are useful; in more advanced work complex numbers and fourier series and transforms are used.

Wavefunction	Nomenclature	Superposition	Resultant
Standing wave		$$\begin{align} y_1+y_2 & = A \sin \left ( k x - \omega t \right ) \\ & + A \sin \left ( k x + \omega t \right ) \end{align}\,\!$$	$y = 2A \sin \left ( k x \right ) \cos \left ( \omega t \right ) \,\!$
Beats	$\langle \omega \rangle = \frac{\omega_1 + \omega_2}{2} \,\!$; $\langle k \rangle = \frac{k_1 + k_2}{2} \,\!$; $\Delta \omega = \omega_1 - \omega_2 \,\!$; $\Delta k = k_1 - k_2 \,\!$	$$\begin{align} y_1 + y_2 & = A \sin \left ( k_1 x - \omega_1 t \right ) \\ & + A \sin \left ( k_2 x + \omega_2 t \right ) \end{align}\,\!$$	$y = 2 A \sin \left ( \langle k \rangle x - \langle \omega \rangle t \right ) \cos \left ( \frac{\Delta k}{2} x - \frac{\Delta \omega}{2} t \right ) \,\!$
Coherent interference		$$\begin{align} y_1+y_2 & = 2A \sin \left ( k x - \omega t \right ) \\ & + A \sin \left ( k x + \omega t + \phi \right ) \end{align}\,\!$$	$y = 2 A \cos \left ( \frac{\phi}{2} \right ) \sin \left ( k x - \omega t + \frac{\phi}{2} \right ) \,\!$

== See also ==
- Defining equation (physical chemistry)
- List of equations in classical mechanics
- List of equations in fluid mechanics
- List of equations in gravitation
- List of equations in nuclear and particle physics
- List of equations in quantum mechanics
- List of photonics equations
- List of relativistic equations
- SI electromagnetism units
- Wave equation
- One-way wave equation

== Sources ==
- P.M. Whelan; M.J. Hodgeson (1978). Essential Principles of Physics (2nd ed.). John Murray. ISBN 0-7195-3382-1.
- G. Woan (2010). The Cambridge Handbook of Physics Formulas. Cambridge University Press. ISBN 978-0-521-57507-2.
- A. Halpern (1988). 3000 Solved Problems in Physics, Schaum Series. Mc Graw Hill. ISBN 978-0-07-025734-4.
- R.G. Lerner; G.L. Trigg (2005). Encyclopaedia of Physics (2nd ed.). VHC Publishers, Hans Warlimont, Springer. pp. 12–13. ISBN 978-0-07-025734-4.
- C.B. Parker (1994). McGraw Hill Encyclopaedia of Physics (2nd ed.). McGraw Hill. ISBN 0-07-051400-3.
- P.A. Tipler; G. Mosca (2008). Physics for Scientists and Engineers: With Modern Physics (6th ed.). W.H. Freeman and Co. ISBN 978-1-4292-0265-7.
- L.N. Hand; J.D. Finch (2008). Analytical Mechanics. Cambridge University Press. ISBN 978-0-521-57572-0.
- T.B. Arkill; C.J. Millar (1974). Mechanics, Vibrations and Waves. John Murray. ISBN 0-7195-2882-8.
- H.J. Pain (1983). The Physics of Vibrations and Waves (3rd ed.). John Wiley & Sons. ISBN 0-471-90182-2.
- J.R. Forshaw; A.G. Smith (2009). Dynamics and Relativity. Wiley. ISBN 978-0-470-01460-8.
- G.A.G. Bennet (1974). Electricity and Modern Physics (2nd ed.). Edward Arnold (UK). ISBN 0-7131-2459-8.
- I.S. Grant; W.R. Phillips; Manchester Physics (2008). Electromagnetism (2nd ed.). John Wiley & Sons. ISBN 978-0-471-92712-9.
- D.J. Griffiths (2007). Introduction to Electrodynamics (3rd ed.). Pearson Education, Dorling Kindersley. ISBN 978-81-7758-293-2.
