= List of equations in nuclear and particle physics =

This article summarizes equations in the theory of nuclear physics and particle physics.

== Definitions ==
Quantity (common name/s)	(Common) symbol/s	Defining equation	SI units	Dimension
Number of atoms	N = Number of atoms remaining at time t N_{0} = Initial number of atoms at time t = 0 N_{D} = Number of atoms decayed at time t	$N_0 = N + N_D \,\!$	dimensionless	dimensionless
Decay rate, activity of a radioisotope	A	$A = \lambda N\,\!$	Bq = Hz = s^{−1}	[T]^{−1}
Decay constant	λ	$\lambda = A/N \,\!$	Bq = Hz = s^{−1}	[T]^{−1}
Half-life of a radioisotope	t_{1/2}, T_{1/2}	Time taken for half the number of atoms present to decay $t \rightarrow t + T_{1/2} \,\!$ $N \rightarrow N / 2 \,\!$	s	[T]
Number of half-lives	n (no standard symbol)	$n = t / T_{1/2} \,\!$	dimensionless	dimensionless
Radioisotope time constant, mean lifetime of an atom before decay	τ (no standard symbol)	$\tau = 1 / \lambda \,\!$	s	[T]
Absorbed dose, total ionizing dose (total energy of radiation transferred to unit mass)	D can only be found experimentally	N/A	Gy = 1 J/kg (Gray)	[L]^{2}[T]^{−2}
Equivalent dose	H	$H = DQ \,\!$ Q = radiation quality factor (dimensionless)	Sv = J kg^{−1} (Sievert)	[L]^{2}[T]^{−2}
Effective dose	E	$E = \sum_j H_jW_j \,\!$ W_{j} = weighting factors corresponding to radiosensitivities of matter (dimensionless) $\sum_j W_j = 1 \,\!$	Sv = J kg^{−1} (Sievert)	[L]^{2}[T]^{−2}

== Equations ==
=== Nuclear structure ===
Physical situation	Nomenclature	Equations
Mass number	A = (Relative) atomic mass = Mass number = Sum of protons and neutrons; N = Number of neutrons; Z = Atomic number = Number of protons = Number of electrons	$A = Z+N\,\!$
Mass in nuclei	M'_{nuc} = Mass of nucleus, bound nucleons; M_{Σ} = Sum of masses for isolated nucleons; m_{p} = proton rest mass; m_{n} = neutron rest mass	$M_\Sigma = Zm_p + Nm_n \,\!$; $M_\Sigma > M_N \,\!$; $\Delta M = M_\Sigma - M_\mathrm{nuc} \,\!$; $\Delta E = \Delta M c^2\,\!$
Nuclear radius	r_{0} ≈ 1.2 fm	$r=r_0A^{1/3} \,\!$ hence (approximately): nuclear volume ∝ A; nuclear surface ∝ A^{2/3}
Nuclear binding energy, empirical curve	Dimensionless parameters to fit experiment: E_{B} = binding energy, a_{v} = nuclear volume coefficient, a_{s} = nuclear surface coefficient, a_{c} = electrostatic interaction coefficient, a_{a} = symmetry/asymmetry extent coefficient for the numbers of neutrons/protons,	$$\begin{align} E_B = & a_v A - a_s A^{2/3} - a_c Z(Z-1)A^{-1/3} \\ & -a_a (N-Z)^2 A^{-1} + 12\delta(N,Z)A^{-1/2} \\ \end{align}$$ where (due to pairing of nuclei): δ(N, Z) = +1 even N, even Z, δ(N, Z) = −1 odd N, odd Z, δ(N, Z) = 0 odd A

=== Nuclear decay ===
Physical situation	Nomenclature	Equations
Radioactive decay	N_{0} = Initial number of atoms; N = Number of atoms at time t; λ = Decay constant; t = Time	Statistical decay of a radionuclide: $\frac{\mathrm{d} N}{\mathrm{d} t} = - \lambda N$ $N = N_0e^{-\lambda t}\,\!$
Bateman's equations	$c_i = \prod_{j=1, i\neq j}^D \frac{\lambda_j}{\lambda_j - \lambda_i}$	$N_D = \frac{N_1(0)}{\lambda_D} \sum_{i=1}^D \lambda_i c_i e^{-\lambda_i t}$
Radiation flux	I_{0} = Initial intensity/Flux of radiation; I = Number of atoms at time t; μ = Linear absorption coefficient; x = Thickness of substance	$I = I_0e^{-\mu x}\,\!$

=== Nuclear scattering theory ===
The following apply for the nuclear reaction:

a + b ↔ R → c

in the centre of mass frame, where a and b are the initial species about to collide, c is the final species, and R is the resonant state.

Physical situation	Nomenclature	Equations
Breit-Wigner formula	E_{0} = Resonant energy; Γ, Γ_{ab}, Γ_{c} are widths of R, a + b, c respectively; k = incoming wavenumber; s = spin angular momenta of a and b; J = total angular momentum of R	Cross-section: $\sigma(E) = \frac{\pi g}{k^2}\frac{\Gamma_{ab}\Gamma_c}{(E-E_0)^2+\Gamma^2/4}$ Spin factor: $g = \frac{2J+1}{(2s_a+1)(2s_b+1)}$ Total width: $\Gamma = \Gamma_{ab} + \Gamma_c$ Resonance lifetime: $\tau = \hbar/\Gamma$
Born scattering	r = radial distance; μ = Scattering angle; A = 2 (spin-0), −1 (spin-half particles); Δk = change in wavevector due to scattering; V = total interaction potential; V = total interaction potential	Differential cross-section: $\frac{d\sigma}{d\Omega} = \left|\frac{2\mu}{\hbar^2}\int_0^\infty\frac{\sin(\Delta kr)}{\Delta kr}V(r)r^2dr\right|^2$
Mott scattering	χ = reduced mass of a and b; v = incoming velocity	Differential cross-section (for identical particles in a coulomb potential, in centre of mass frame): $\frac{d\sigma}{d\Omega}=\left(\frac{\alpha}{4E}\right)\left[\csc^{4}\frac{\chi}{2}+\sec^{4}\frac{\chi}{2}+\frac{A\cos\left(\frac{\alpha}{\hbar\nu}\ln\tan^{2}\frac{\chi}{2}\right)}{\sin^{2}\frac{\chi}{2}\cos\frac{\chi}{2}}\right]^{2}$ Scattering potential energy (α = constant): $V = -\alpha/r$
Rutherford scattering		Differential cross-section (non-identical particles in a coulomb potential): $\frac{d\sigma}{d\Omega}=\left(\frac{1}{n}\right)\frac{dN}{d\Omega} = \left(\frac{\alpha}{4E}\right)^2 \csc^4\frac{\chi}{2}$

=== Fundamental forces ===
These equations need to be refined such that the notation is defined as has been done for the previous sets of equations.

Name	Equations
Strong force	$$\begin{align} \mathcal{L}_\mathrm{QCD} & = \bar{\psi}_i\left(i \gamma^\mu (D_\mu)_{ij} - m\, \delta_{ij}\right) \psi_j - \frac{1}{4}G^a_{\mu \nu} G^{\mu \nu}_a \\ & = \bar{\psi}_i (i \gamma^\mu \partial_\mu  -  m )\psi_i - g G^a_\mu \bar{\psi}_i \gamma^\mu T^a_{ij} \psi_j - \frac{1}{4}G^a_{\mu \nu} G^{\mu \nu}_a \,,\\ \end{align} \,\!$$
Electroweak interaction	$\mathcal{L}_\mathrm{EW} = \mathcal{L}_g + \mathcal{L}_f + \mathcal{L}_h + \mathcal{L}_y.\,\!$ $$\mathcal{L}_g = -\frac{1}{4}W_a^{\mu\nu}W_{\mu\nu}^a - \frac{1}{4}B^{\mu\nu}B_{\mu\nu}\,\!$$ $$\mathcal{L}_f =   \overline{Q}_i iD\!\!\!\!/\; Q_i+ \overline{u}_i^c iD\!\!\!\!/\; u^c_i+ \overline{d}_i^c iD\!\!\!\!/\; d^c_i+ \overline{L}_i iD\!\!\!\!/\; L_i+ \overline{e}^c_i iD\!\!\!\!/\; e^c_i \,\!$$ $$\mathcal{L}_h = |D_\mu h|^2 - \lambda \left(|h|^2 - \frac{v^2}{2}\right)^2\,\!$$ $$\mathcal{L}_y = - y_{u\, ij} \epsilon^{ab} \,h_b^\dagger\, \overline{Q}_{ia} u_j^c - y_{d\, ij}\, h\, \overline{Q}_i d^c_j - y_{e\,ij} \,h\, \overline{L}_i e^c_j + h.c.\,\!$$
Quantum electrodynamics	$\mathcal{L}_\mathrm{QED}=\bar\psi(i\gamma^\mu D_\mu-m)\psi -\frac{1}{4}F_{\mu\nu}F^{\mu\nu}\;,\,\!$

== See also ==
- Defining equation (physical chemistry)
- List of electromagnetism equations
- List of equations in classical mechanics
- List of equations in quantum mechanics
- List of equations in wave theory
- List of photonics equations
- List of relativistic equations
- Relativistic wave equations

== Sources ==
- B. R. Martin, G.Shaw (3 December 2008). Particle Physics (3rd ed.). Manchester Physics Series, John Wiley & Sons. ISBN 978-0-470-03294-7.
- D. McMahon (2008). Quantum Field Theory. Mc Graw Hill (USA). ISBN 978-0-07-154382-8.
- P.M. Whelan, M.J. Hodgeson (1978). Essential Principles of Physics (2nd ed.). John Murray. ISBN 0-7195-3382-1.
- G. Woan (2010). The Cambridge Handbook of Physics Formulas. Cambridge University Press. ISBN 978-0-521-57507-2.
- A. Halpern (1988). 3000 Solved Problems in Physics, Schaum Series. Mc Graw Hill. ISBN 978-0-07-025734-4.
- R.G. Lerner, G.L. Trigg (2005). Encyclopaedia of Physics (2nd ed.). VHC Publishers, Hans Warlimont, Springer. pp. 12–13. ISBN 978-0-07-025734-4.
- C.B. Parker (1994). McGraw Hill Encyclopaedia of Physics (2nd ed.). McGraw Hill. ISBN 0-07-051400-3.
- P.A. Tipler, G. Mosca (2008). Physics for Scientists and Engineers: With Modern Physics (6th ed.). W.H. Freeman and Co. ISBN 978-1-4292-0265-7.
- J.R. Forshaw, A.G. Smith (2009). Dynamics and Relativity. Wiley. ISBN 978-0-470-01460-8.
