= Rita G. Lerner =

American physicist, librarian

Rita Dorothy Guggenheim Lerner (May 7, 1929 – July 16, 1994) was an American physicist, librarian, editor, and science communicator who worked for many years at the American Institute of Physics. With George L. Trigg, she was co-editor of the Encyclopedia of Physics (Addison-Wesley, 1981).

== Life ==
Rita Guggenheim was born in New York, New York, in 1929, and was a 1945 graduate of Fiorello H. LaGuardia High School. She earned a bachelor's degree from Radcliffe College in 1949, and was managing editor of the college yearbook. She went to Columbia University for graduate study, earning a master's degree in 1951 and (as Rita G. Lerner) completing her Ph.D. in 1956; her dissertation was Microwave Studies of Molecular Structure.

She came to the American Institute of Physics in the 1960s, hired as part of a program funded by the National Science Foundation for the improvement of scientific communication.

She died on July 16, 1994, in Ardsley, New York.

== Recognition ==
Lerner was named a Fellow of the American Association for the Advancement of Science in 1986.
