= Defining equation (physical chemistry) =

In physical chemistry, there are numerous quantities associated with chemical compounds and reactions; notably in terms of amounts of substance, activity or concentration of a substance, and the rate of reaction. This article uses SI units.

== Introduction ==
Theoretical chemistry requires quantities from core physics, such as time, volume, temperature, and pressure. But the highly quantitative nature of physical chemistry, in a more specialized way than core physics, uses molar amounts of substance rather than simply counting numbers; this leads to the specialized definitions in this article. Core physics itself rarely uses the mole, except in areas overlapping thermodynamics and chemistry.

== Notes on nomenclature ==
Entity refers to the type of particle/s in question, such as atoms, molecules, complexes, radicals, ions, electrons etc.

Conventionally for concentrations and activities, square brackets [ ] are used around the chemical molecular formula. For an arbitrary atom, generic letters in upright non-bold typeface such as A, B, R, X or Y etc. are often used.

No standard symbols are used for the following quantities, as specifically applied to a substance:

- the mass of a substance m,
- the number of moles of the substance n,
- partial pressure of a gas in a gaseous mixture p (or P),
- some form of energy of a substance (for chemistry enthalpy H is common),
- entropy of a substance S
- the electronegativity of an atom or chemical bond χ.

Usually the symbol for the quantity with a subscript of some reference to the quantity is used, or the quantity is written with the reference to the chemical in round brackets. For example, the mass of water might be written in subscripts as m_{H_{2}O}, m_{water}, m_{aq}, m_{w} (if clear from context) etc., or simply as m(H_{2}O). Another example could be the electronegativity of the fluorine-fluorine covalent bond, which might be written with subscripts χ_{F-F}, χ_{FF} or χ_{F-F} etc., or brackets χ(F-F), χ(FF) etc.

Neither is standard. For the purpose of this article, the nomenclature is as follows, closely (but not exactly) matching standard use.

For general equations with no specific reference to an entity, quantities are written as their symbols with an index to label the component of the mixture - i.e. q_{i}. The labeling is arbitrary in initial choice, but once chosen fixed for the calculation.

If any reference to an actual entity (say hydrogen ions H^{+}) or any entity at all (say X) is made, the quantity symbol q is followed by curved ( ) brackets enclosing the molecular formula of X, i.e. q(X), or for a component i of a mixture q(X_{i}). No confusion should arise with the notation for a mathematical function.

== Quantification ==
=== General basic quantities ===
Quantity (Common Name/s)	(Common) Symbol/s	SI Units	Dimension
Number of molecules	N	dimensionless	dimensionless
Mass	m	kg	[M]
Number of moles, amount of substance, amount	n	mol	[N]
Volume of mixture or solvent, unless otherwise stated	V	m^{3}	[L]^{3}

=== General derived quantities ===
Quantity (Common Name/s)	(Common) Symbol/s	Defining Equation	SI Units	Dimension
Relative atomic mass of an element	A_{r}, A, m_{ram}	$A_r \left ( {\rm X} \right ) = \frac{\langle m \left ( {\rm X} \right ) \rangle }{m \left ( ^{12}{\rm C} \right ) / 12}$ The average mass $\langle m \left ( {\rm X} \right ) \rangle$ is the average of the T masses m_{i}(X) corresponding the T isotopes of X (i is a dummy index labelling each isotope): $\langle m \left ( {\rm X} \right ) \rangle = \frac{1}{T} \sum_i^T m \left ( {\rm X}_i \right )$	dimensionless	dimensionless
Relative formula mass of a compound, containing elements X_{j}	M_{r}, M, m_{rfm}	$M_r \left ( {\rm Y} \right ) = \sum_j N \left ( {\rm X}_j \right ) A_r \left ( {\rm X}_j \right ) = \frac{\sum_j N \left ( {\rm X}_j \right ) \langle m \left ( {\rm X}_j \right ) \rangle }{m \left ( ^{12}{\rm C} \right ) / 12}$ j = index labelling each element, N = number of atoms of each element X_{i}.	dimensionless	dimensionless
Molar concentration, concentration, molarity of a component i in a mixture	c_{i}, [X_{i}]	$c_i = \left [ {\rm X}_i \right ] = \frac{\mathrm{d} n_i}{\mathrm{d} V}$	mol dm^{−3} = 10^{−3} mol m^{−3}	[N] [L]^{−3}
Molality of a component i in a mixture	b_{i}, b(X_{i})	$b_i = \frac{n_i}{m_{\rm solv}}$ where solv = solvent (liquid solution).	mol kg^{−1}	[N] [M]^{−1}
Mole fraction of a component i in a mixture	x_{i}, x(X_{i})	$x_i = \frac{n_i}{n_{\rm mix}}$ where Mix = mixture.	dimensionless	dimensionless
Partial pressure of a gaseous component i in a gas mixture	p_{i}, p(X_{i})	$p \left( {\rm X}_i \right ) = x_i p\left( {\rm mix} \right )$ where mix = gaseous mixture.	Pa = N m^{−2}	[M][T][L]^{−1}
Density, mass concentration	ρ_{i}, γ_{i}, ρ(X_{i})	$\rho = m_i/V\,\!$	kg m^{−3}	[M] [L]^{3}
Number density, number concentration	C_{i}, C(X_{i})	$C_i = N_i/V\,\!$	m^{− 3}	[L]^{− 3}
Volume fraction, volume concentration	ϕ_{i}, ϕ(X_{i})	$\phi_i = \frac{V_i}{V_{\rm mix}}$	dimensionless	dimensionless
Mixing ratio, mole ratio	r_{i}, r(X_{i})	$r_i = \frac{n_i}{n_{\rm mix}- n_i}$	dimensionless	dimensionless
Mass fraction	w_{i}, w(X_{i})	$w_i = m_i / m_{\rm mix} \,\!$ m(X_{i}) = mass of X_{i}	dimensionless	dimensionless
Mixing ratio, mass ratio	ζ_{i}, ζ(X_{i})	$\zeta_i = \frac{m_i}{m_{\rm mix}- m_i}$ m(X_{i}) = mass of X_{i}	dimensionless	dimensionless

== Kinetics and equilibria ==
The defining formulae for the equilibrium constants K_{c} (all reactions) and K_{p} (gaseous reactions) apply to the general chemical reaction:

$\ce{{\nu_1 X1} + {\nu_2 X2} + \cdots + \nu_\mathit{r} X_\mathit{r} <=> {\eta_1 Y1} + {\eta_2 Y2} + \cdots + \eta_\mathit{p} {Y}_\mathit{p}}$

and the defining equation for the rate constant k applies to the simpler synthesis reaction (one product only):

$\ce{{\nu_1 X1} + {\nu_2 X2} + \cdots + \nu_\mathit{r} X_\mathit{r} -> \eta {Y}}$

where:

- i = dummy index labelling component i of reactant mixture,
- j = dummy index labelling component i of product mixture,
- X_{i} = component i of the reactant mixture,
- Y_{j} = reactant component j of the product mixture,
- r (as an index) = number of reactant components,
- p (as an index) = number of product components,
- ν_{i} = stoichiometry number for component i in product mixture,
- η_{j} = stoichiometry number for component j in product mixture,
- σ_{i} = order of reaction for component i in reactant mixture.

The dummy indices on the substances X and Y label the components (arbitrary but fixed for calculation); they are not the numbers of each component molecules as in usual chemistry notation.

The units for the chemical constants are unusual since they can vary depending on the stoichiometry of the reaction, and the number of reactant and product components. The general units for equilibrium constants can be determined by usual methods of dimensional analysis. For the generality of the kinetics and equilibria units below, let the indices for the units be;

$S_1 = \sum_{j=1}^p \eta_j - \sum_{i=1}^r \nu_i \,,\quad\, S_2 = 1-\sum_{i=1}^{r} \sigma_i\,.$

Click here to see their derivation

For the constant K_{c};

Substitute the concentration units into the equation and simplify:,

$$\begin{align}
K_c & = \frac{\prod_{j=1}^p \left [ \ce Y_j \right ]^{y_j}}{\prod_{i=1}^r \left [ \ce X_i \right ]^{x_i} } \\
\left[K_c\right] & = \frac{\prod_{j=1}^p [\ce M]^{y_j}}{\prod_{i=1}^r [\ce M]^{x_i} }  \\
& = \frac{[\ce M]^{y_1} [\ce M]^{y_2} \cdots [\ce M]^{y_p}}{[\ce M]^{x_1} [\ce M]^{x_2} \cdots [\ce M]^{x_r} }  \\
& = \frac{[\ce M]^{\sum_{j=1}^p y_j}}{[\ce M]^{\sum_{i=1}^r x_i} }  \\
& = [\ce M]^{\sum_{j=1}^p y_j - \sum_{i=1}^r x_i}
\end{align}
\
(\ce{M = mol \; dm^{-3}})$$

The procedure is exactly identical for K_{p}.

For the constant k

$$\begin{align}
k & = \frac{\frac{\mathrm{d}[\ce Y]}{\mathrm{d}t}}{\prod_{i=1}^{r}\left[ \ce X_i \right]^{\sigma_i}} \\
\left[k\right] & = \frac{[\ce M]s^{-1}}{\prod_{i=1}^{r}[\ce M]^{\sigma_i}} \\
& = \frac{[\ce M]s^{-1}}{[\ce M]^{\sum_{i=1}^{r} \sigma_i}} \\
& = [\ce M]^{1-\sum_{i=1}^{r} \sigma_i} s^{-1}
\end{align}$$

Quantity (Common Name/s)	(Common) Symbol/s	Defining Equation	SI Units	Dimension
Reaction progress variable, extent of reaction	ξ	$\xi$	dimensionless	dimensionless
Stoichiometric coefficient of a component i in a mixture, in reaction j (many reactions could occur at once)	ν_{i}	$\nu_{ij} = \frac{\mathrm{d}N_i}{\mathrm{d}\xi_j} \,$ where N_{i} = number of molecules of component i.	dimensionless	dimensionless
Chemical affinity	A	$A = - \left ( \frac{\partial G }{\partial \xi} \right )_{P,T}$	J	[M][L]^{2}[T]^{−2}
Reaction rate with respect to component i	r, R	$R_i = \frac{1}{\nu_i} \frac{\mathrm{d} \left [ \mathrm{X}_i \right ]}{\mathrm{d} t}$	mol dm^{−3} s^{−1} = 10^{−3} mol m^{−3} s^{−1}	[N] [L]^{−3} [T]^{−1}
Activity of a component i in a mixture	a_{i}	$a_i = e^{\left ( \mu_i - \mu^{\ominus}_i \right )/RT}$	dimensionless	dimensionless
Mole fraction, molality, and molar concentration activity coefficients	γ_{xi} for mole fraction, γ_{bi} for molality, γ_{ci} for molar concentration.	Three coefficients are used; $a_i = \gamma_{xi} x_i \,$ $a_i = \gamma_{bi} b_i/b^{\ominus} \,$ $a_i = \gamma_{ci} \left [ \mathrm{X}_i \right ]/\left [ \mathrm{X}_i \right ]^{\ominus} \,$	dimensionless	dimensionless
Rate constant	k	$k = \frac{\mathrm{d}\left [ \mathrm{Y} \right ]/\mathrm{d}t}{\prod_{i=1}^{r}\left [ \mathrm{X}_i \right ]^{\sigma_i}}$	(mol dm^{−3})^{(S2)} s^{−1}	([N] [L]^{−3})^{(S2)} [T]^{−1}
General equilibrium constant	K_{c}	$K_c = \frac{\prod_{j=1}^p \left [ \mathrm{Y}_j \right ]^{\eta_j}}{\prod_{i=1}^r \left [ \mathrm{X}_i \right ]^{\nu_i} }$	(mol dm^{−3})^{(S1)}	([N] [L]^{−3})^{(S1)}
General thermodynamic activity constant	K_{0}	$K_0 = \frac{\prod_{j=1}^p a \left ( \mathrm{Y}_j \right )^{\eta_j}}{\prod_{i=1}^r a \left ( \mathrm{X}_i \right )^{\nu_i} }$ a(X_{i}) and a(Y_{j}) are activities of X_{i} and Y_{j} respectively.	(mol dm^{−3})^{(S1)}	([N] [L]^{−3})^{(S1)}
Equilibrium constant for gaseous reactions, using Partial pressures	K_{p}	$K_p = \frac{\prod_{j=1}^p p\left ( \mathrm{Y}_j \right )^{\eta_j}}{\prod_{i=1}^r p\left ( \mathrm{X}_i \right )^{\nu_i} }$	Pa^{(S1)}	([M] [L]^{−1} [T]^{−2})^{(S1)}
Logarithm of any equilibrium constant	pK_{c}	$\mathrm{p} K_c = -\log_{10} K_c = \sum_{j=1}^p \eta_j \log_{10} \left [ \mathrm{Y}_j \right ] - \sum_{i=1}^r \nu_i \log_{10} \left [ \mathrm{X}_i \right ]$	dimensionless	dimensionless
Logarithm of dissociation constant	pK	$\mathrm{p} K = -\log_{10} K$	dimensionless	dimensionless
Logarithm of hydrogen ion (H^{+}) activity, pH	pH	$\mathrm{pH} = -\log_{10} [\mathrm{H}^+]$	dimensionless	dimensionless
Logarithm of hydroxide ion (OH^{−}) activity, pOH	pOH	$\mathrm{pOH} = -\log_{10} [\mathrm{OH}^{-}]$	dimensionless	dimensionless

== Electrochemistry ==
Notation for half-reaction standard electrode potentials is as follows. The redox reaction

$\ce{A + BX <=> B + AX}$

split into:

- a reduction reaction: $\ce{B+ + e^- <=> B}$
- and an oxidation reaction: $\ce{A+ + e^- <=> A}$

(written this way by convention) the electrode potential for the half reactions are written as $E^\ominus\left(\ce{A+} \vert \ce{A} \right)$ and $E^\ominus\left( \ce{B+} \vert \ce{B} \right)$ respectively.

For the case of a metal-metal half electrode, letting M represent the metal and z be its valency, the half reaction takes the form of a reduction reaction:

$\ce{{M^{+\mathit{z}}} + \mathit{z} e^- <=> M}$

Quantity (Common Name/s)	(Common) Symbol/s	Defining Equation	SI Units	Dimension
Standard EMF of an electrode	$E^\ominus, E^\ominus\left( \ce{X} \right)$	$\Delta E^\ominus \left( \ce{X} \right ) = E^{\ominus} \left( \ce{X} \right ) - E^{\ominus} \left( \ce{Def} \right )$ where Def is the standard electrode of definition, defined to have zero potential. The chosen one is hydrogen: $E^{\ominus} \left( \ce{H+} \right ) = E^{\ominus} \left( \ce{H+} \vert \ce{H} \right ) = 0$	V	[M][L]^{2}[I][T]^{−1}
Standard EMF of an electrochemical cell	$E_\mathrm{cell}^\ominus , \Delta E^\ominus$	$E_\mathrm{cell}^\ominus = E^\ominus\left( \mathrm{Cat} \right ) - E^\ominus\left( \mathrm{An} \right )$ where Cat is the cathode substance and An is the anode substance.	V	[M][L]^{2}[I][T]^{−1}
Ionic strength	I	Two definitions are used, one using molarity concentration, $I = \frac{1}{2}\sum_{i = 1}^{N} z_i^{2} \left [ {\rm X}_i \right ]$ and one using molality, $I = \frac{1}{2}\sum_{i = 1}^{N} z_i^{2} b_i$ The sum is taken over all ions in the solution.	mol dm^{−3} or mol dm^{−3} kg^{−1}	[N] [L]^{−3} [M]^{−1}
Electrochemical potential (of component i in a mixture)	$\bar{\mu}_i \,\!$	$\bar{\mu}_i = \mu - z e N_A \phi \,\!$ φ = local electrostatic potential (see below also) z_{i} = valency (charge) of the ion i	J	[M][L]^{2}[T]^{−2}

== Quantum chemistry ==
Quantity (Common Name/s)	(Common) Symbol/s	Defining Equation	SI Units	Dimension
Electronegativity	χ	Pauling (difference between atoms A and B): $\chi_{\rm A} - \chi_{\rm B} = ({\rm eV})^{-1/2} \sqrt{E_{\rm d}({\rm AB}) - [E_{\rm d}({\rm AA}) + E_{\rm d}({\rm BB})]/2}$ Mulliken (absolute): $\chi = 10^{-3}\left [ 187 \left ( E_{I} + E_{EA} \right ) + 170 \right ] \,$ Energies (in eV) E_{d} = Bond dissociation E_{I} = Ionization E_{EA} = Electron affinity	dimensionless	dimensionless

== Sources ==
- Physical chemistry, P.W. Atkins, Oxford University Press, 1978, ISBN 0-19-855148-7
- Chemistry, Matter and the Universe, R.E. Dickerson, I. Geis, W.A. Benjamin Inc. (USA), 1976, ISBN 0-8053-2369-4
- Chemical thermodynamics, D.J.G. Ives, University Chemistry Series, Macdonald Technical and Scientific co. ISBN 0-356-03736-3.
- Elements of Statistical Thermodynamics (2nd Edition), L.K. Nash, Principles of Chemistry, Addison-Wesley, 1974, ISBN 0-201-05229-6
- Statistical Physics (2nd Edition), F. Mandl, Manchester Physics, John Wiley & Sons, 2008, ISBN 978-0-471-91533-1
