= List of equations in classical mechanics =

Classical mechanics is the branch of physics used to describe the motion of macroscopic objects. It is the most familiar of the theories of physics. The concepts it covers, such as mass, acceleration, and force, are commonly used and known. The subject is based upon a three-dimensional Euclidean space with fixed axes, called a frame of reference. The point of concurrency of the three axes is known as the origin of the particular space.

Classical mechanics utilises many equations—as well as other mathematical concepts—which relate various physical quantities to one another. These include differential equations, manifolds, Lie groups, and ergodic theory. This article gives a summary of the most important of these.

This article lists equations from Newtonian mechanics, see analytical mechanics for the more general formulation of classical mechanics (which includes Lagrangian and Hamiltonian mechanics).

== Classical mechanics ==
=== Mass and inertia ===
Quantity (common name/s)	(Common) symbol/s	Defining equation	SI units	Dimension
Linear, surface, volumetric mass density	λ or μ (especially in acoustics, see below) for Linear, σ for surface, ρ for volume.	$m = \int \lambda \, \mathrm{d} \ell$ $m = \iint \sigma \, \mathrm{d} S$ $m = \iiint \rho \, \mathrm{d} V$	kg m^{−n}, n = 1, 2, 3	M L^{−n}
Moment of mass	m (No common symbol)	Point mass: $$\mathbf{m} = \mathbf{r}m$$ Discrete masses about an axis $x_i$: $$\mathbf{m} = \sum_{i=1}^N \mathbf{r}_i m_i$$ Continuum of mass about an axis $x_i$: $$\mathbf{m} = \int \rho \left ( \mathbf{r} \right ) x_i \mathrm{d} \mathbf{r}$$	kg m	M L
Center of mass	r_{com} (Symbols vary)	i-th moment of mass $\mathbf{m}_i = \mathbf{r}_i m_i$ Discrete masses: $$\mathbf{r}_\mathrm{com} = \frac{1}{M} \sum_i \mathbf{r}_i m_i = \frac{1}{M} \sum_i \mathbf{m}_i$$ Mass continuum: $$\mathbf{r}_\mathrm{com} = \frac{1}{M} \int \mathrm{d}\mathbf{m} = \frac{1}{M} \int \mathbf{r} \, \mathrm{d}m = \frac{1}{M}\int \mathbf{r} \rho \, \mathrm{d}V$$	m	L
2-Body reduced mass	m_{12}, μ Pair of masses = m_{1} and m_{2}	$\mu = \frac{m_1 m_2}{m_1 + m_2}$	kg	M
Moment of inertia (MOI)	I	Discrete Masses: $$I = \sum_i \mathbf{m}_i \cdot \mathbf{r}_i = \sum_i \left | \mathbf{r}_i \right | ^2 m$$ Mass continuum: $$I = \int \left | \mathbf{r} \right | ^2 \mathrm{d} m = \int \mathbf{r} \cdot \mathrm{d} \mathbf{m}  = \int \left | \mathbf{r} \right | ^2 \rho \, \mathrm{d}V$$	kg m^{2}	M L^{2}

=== Derived kinematic quantities ===
Kinematic quantities of a classical particle: mass m, position r, velocity v, acceleration a.

Quantity (common name/s)	(Common) symbol/s	Defining equation	SI units	Dimension
Velocity	v	$\mathbf{v} = \frac{\mathrm{d} \mathbf{r}}{\mathrm{d} t}$	m s^{−1}	L T^{−1}
Acceleration	a	$\mathbf{a} = \frac{\mathrm{d} \mathbf{v}}{\mathrm{d} t} = \frac{\mathrm{d}^2 \mathbf{r}}{\mathrm{d} t^2 }$	m s^{−2}	L T^{−2}
Jerk	j	$\mathbf{j} = \frac{\mathrm{d} \mathbf{a}}{\mathrm{d} t} = \frac{\mathrm{d}^3 \mathbf{r}}{\mathrm{d} t^3}$	m s^{−3}	L T^{−3}
Jounce	s	$\mathbf{s} = \frac{\mathrm{d} \mathbf{j}}{\mathrm{d} t} = \frac{\mathrm{d}^4 \mathbf{r}}{\mathrm{d} t^4}$	m s^{−4}	L T^{−4}
Angular velocity	ω	$\boldsymbol{\omega} = \mathbf{\hat{n}} \frac{ \mathrm{d} \theta }{\mathrm{d} t}$	rad s^{−1}	T^{−1}
Angular Acceleration	α	$\boldsymbol{\alpha} = \frac{\mathrm{d} \boldsymbol{\omega}}{\mathrm{d} t} = \mathbf{\hat{n}} \frac{\mathrm{d}^2 \theta}{\mathrm{d} t^2}$	rad s^{−2}	T^{−2}
Angular jerk	ζ	$\boldsymbol{\zeta} = \frac{\mathrm{d} \boldsymbol{\alpha}}{\mathrm{d} t} = \mathbf{\hat{n}} \frac{ \mathrm{d}^3 \theta}{\mathrm{d} t^3}$	rad s^{−3}	T^{−3}

=== Derived dynamic quantities ===
Angular momenta of a classical object. Left: intrinsic "spin" angular momentum S is really orbital angular momentum of the object at every point, right: extrinsic orbital angular momentum L about an axis, top: the moment of inertia tensor I and angular velocity ω (L is not always parallel to ω) bottom: momentum p and its radial position r from the axis. The total angular momentum (spin + orbital) is J.

Quantity (common name/s)	(Common) symbol/s	Defining equation	SI units	Dimension
Momentum	p	$\mathbf{p} = m\mathbf{v}$	kg m s^{−1}	M L T^{−1}
Force	F	$\mathbf{F} = \mathrm{d} \mathbf{p}/\mathrm{d} t$	N = kg m s^{−2}	M L T^{−2}
Impulse	J, Δp, I	$\mathbf{J} = \Delta \mathbf{p} = \int_{t_1}^{t_2} \mathbf{F} \, \mathrm{d} t$	kg m s^{−1}	M L T^{−1}
Angular momentum about a position point r_{0},	L, J, S	$\mathbf{L} = \left ( \mathbf{r} - \mathbf{r}_0 \right ) \times \mathbf{p}$ Most of the time we can set r_{0} = 0 if particles are orbiting about axes intersecting at a common point.	kg m^{2} s^{−1}	M L^{2} T^{−1}
Moment of a force about a position point r_{0}, Torque	τ, M	$\boldsymbol{\tau} = \left ( \mathbf{r} - \mathbf{r}_0 \right ) \times \mathbf{F} = \frac{\mathrm{d} \mathbf{L}}{\mathrm{d} t}$	N m = kg m^{2} s^{−2}	M L^{2} T^{−2}
Angular impulse	ΔL (no common symbol)	$\Delta \mathbf{L} = \int_{t_1}^{t_2} \boldsymbol{\tau} \, \mathrm{d} t$	kg m^{2} s^{−1}	M L^{2} T^{−1}

=== General energy definitions ===
Quantity (common name/s)	(Common) symbol/s	Defining equation	SI units	Dimension
Mechanical work due to a Resultant Force	W	$W = \int_C \mathbf{F} \cdot \mathrm{d} \mathbf{r}$	J = N m = kg m^{2} s^{−2}	M L^{2} T^{−2}
Work done ON mechanical system, Work done BY	W_{ON}, W_{BY}	$\Delta W_\mathrm{ON} = - \Delta W_\mathrm{BY}$	J = N m = kg m^{2} s^{−2}	M L^{2} T^{−2}
Potential energy	φ, Φ, U, V, E_{p}	$\Delta W = - \Delta V$	J = N m = kg m^{2} s^{−2}	M L^{2} T^{−2}
Mechanical power	P	$P = \frac{\mathrm{d}E}{\mathrm{d}t}$	W = J s^{−1}	M L^{2} T^{−3}

Every conservative force has a potential energy. By following two principles one can consistently assign a non-relative value to U:

- Wherever the force is zero, its potential energy is defined to be zero as well.
- Whenever the force does work, potential energy is lost.

=== Generalized mechanics ===
Quantity (common name/s)	(Common) symbol/s	Defining equation	SI units	Dimension
Generalized coordinates	q, Q		varies with choice	varies with choice
Generalized velocities	$\dot{q},\dot{Q}$	$\dot{q}\equiv \mathrm{d}q/\mathrm{d}t$	varies with choice	varies with choice
Generalized momenta	p, P	$p = \partial L /\partial \dot{q}$	varies with choice	varies with choice
Lagrangian	L	$L(\mathbf{q},\mathbf{\dot{q}},t) = T(\mathbf{\dot{q}}) - V(\mathbf{q},\mathbf{\dot{q}},t)$ where $\mathbf{q} = \mathbf{q}(t)$ and p = p(t) are vectors of the generalized coords and momenta, as functions of time	J	M L^{2} T^{−2}
Hamiltonian	H	$H(\mathbf{p},\mathbf{q},t) = \mathbf{p}\cdot\mathbf{\dot{q}} - L(\mathbf{q},\mathbf{\dot{q}},t)$	J	M L^{2} T^{−2}
Action, Hamilton's principal function	S, $\scriptstyle{\mathcal{S}}$	$\mathcal{S} = \int_{t_1}^{t_2} L(\mathbf{q},\mathbf{\dot{q}},t) \mathrm{d}t$	J s	M L^{2} T^{−1}

== Kinematics ==
In the following rotational definitions, the angle can be any angle about the specified axis of rotation. It is customary to use θ, but this does not have to be the polar angle used in polar coordinate systems. The unit axial vector

$$\mathbf{\hat{n}} = \mathbf{\hat{e}}_r\times\mathbf{\hat{e}}_\theta$$

defines the axis of rotation, $\scriptstyle \mathbf{\hat{e}}_r$ = unit vector in direction of r, $\scriptstyle \mathbf{\hat{e}}_\theta$ = unit vector tangential to the angle.

	Translation	Rotation
Velocity	Average: $$\mathbf{v}_{\mathrm{average}} = {\Delta \mathbf{r} \over \Delta t}$$ Instantaneous: $$\mathbf{v} = {d\mathbf{r} \over dt}$$	Angular velocity $$\boldsymbol{\omega} = \mathbf{\hat{n}}\frac{{\rm d} \theta}{{\rm d} t}$$ Rotating rigid body: $$\mathbf{v} = \boldsymbol{\omega} \times \mathbf{r}$$
Acceleration	Average: $$\mathbf{a}_{\mathrm{average}} = \frac{\Delta\mathbf{v}}{\Delta t}$$ Instantaneous: $$\mathbf{a} = \frac{d\mathbf{v}}{dt} = \frac{d^2\mathbf{r}}{dt^2}$$	Angular acceleration $$\boldsymbol{\alpha} = \frac{{\rm d} \boldsymbol{\omega}}{{\rm d} t} = \mathbf{\hat{n}}\frac{{\rm d}^2 \theta}{{\rm d} t^2}$$ Rotating rigid body: $$\mathbf{a} = \boldsymbol{\alpha} \times \mathbf{r} + \boldsymbol{\omega} \times \mathbf{v}$$
Jerk	Average: $$\mathbf{j}_{\mathrm{average}} = \frac{\Delta\mathbf{a}}{\Delta t}$$ Instantaneous: $$\mathbf{j} = \frac{d\mathbf{a}}{dt} = \frac{d^2\mathbf{v}}{dt^2} = \frac{d^3\mathbf{r}}{dt^3}$$	Angular jerk $$\boldsymbol{\zeta} = \frac{{\rm d} \boldsymbol{\alpha}}{{\rm d} t} = \mathbf{\hat{n}}\frac{{\rm d}^2 \omega}{{\rm d} t^2} = \mathbf{\hat{n}}\frac{{\rm d}^3 \theta}{{\rm d} t^3}$$ Rotating rigid body: $$\mathbf{j} = \boldsymbol{\zeta} \times \mathbf{r} + \boldsymbol{\alpha} \times \mathbf{a}$$

== Dynamics ==
	Translation	Rotation
Momentum	Momentum is the "amount of translation" $$\mathbf{p} = m\mathbf{v}$$ For a rotating rigid body: $$\mathbf{p} = \boldsymbol{\omega} \times \mathbf{m}$$	Angular momentum Angular momentum is the "amount of rotation": $$\mathbf{L} = \mathbf{r} \times \mathbf{p} = \mathbf{I} \cdot \boldsymbol{\omega}$$ and the cross-product is a pseudovector i.e. if r and p are reversed in direction (negative), L is not. In general I is an order-2 tensor, see above for its components. The dot · indicates tensor contraction.
Force and Newton's 2nd law	Resultant force acts on a system at the center of mass, equal to the rate of change of momentum: $$\begin{align} \mathbf{F} & = \frac{d\mathbf{p}}{dt} = \frac{d(m\mathbf{v})}{dt} \\ & = m\mathbf{a} + \mathbf{v}\frac{{\rm d}m}{{\rm d}t} \\ \end{align}$$ For a number of particles, the equation of motion for one particle i is: $$\frac{\mathrm{d}\mathbf{p}_i}{\mathrm{d}t} = \mathbf{F}_{E} + \sum_{i \neq j} \mathbf{F}_{ij}$$ where p_{i} = momentum of particle i, F_{ij} = force on particle i by particle j, and F_{E} = resultant external force (due to any agent not part of system). Particle i does not exert a force on itself.	Torque Torque τ is also called moment of a force, because it is the rotational analogue to force: $$\boldsymbol{\tau} = \frac{{\rm d}\mathbf{L}}{{\rm d}t} = \mathbf{r}\times\mathbf{F} = \frac{{\rm d}(\mathbf{I} \cdot \boldsymbol{\omega})}{{\rm d}t}$$ For rigid bodies, Newton's 2nd law for rotation takes the same form as for translation: $$\begin{align} \boldsymbol{\tau} & = \frac{{\rm d}\mathbf{L}}{{\rm d}t} = \frac{{\rm d}(\mathbf{I}\cdot\boldsymbol{\omega})}{{\rm d}t} \\ & = \frac{{\rm d}\mathbf{I}}{{\rm d}t}\cdot\boldsymbol{\omega} + \mathbf{I}\cdot\boldsymbol{\alpha} \\ \end{align}$$ Likewise, for a number of particles, the equation of motion for one particle i is: $$\frac{\mathrm{d}\mathbf{L}_i}{\mathrm{d}t} = \boldsymbol{\tau}_E + \sum_{i \neq j} \boldsymbol{\tau}_{ij}$$
Yank	Yank is rate of change of force: $$\begin{align} \mathbf{Y} & = \frac{d\mathbf{F}}{dt}  = \frac{d^2\mathbf{p}}{dt^2} = \frac{d^2(m\mathbf{v})}{dt^2} \\[1ex] & = m\mathbf{j} + \mathbf{2a}\frac{{\rm d}m}{{\rm d}t} + \mathbf{v}\frac{{\rm d^2}m}{{\rm d}t^2} \end{align}$$ For constant mass, it becomes; $$\mathbf{Y} = m\mathbf{j}$$	Rotatum Rotatum Ρ is also called moment of a Yank, because it is the rotational analogue to yank: $$\boldsymbol{\Rho} = \frac{{\rm d}\boldsymbol{\tau}}{{\rm d}t} = \mathbf{r}\times\mathbf{Y} = \frac{{\rm d}(\mathbf{I} \cdot \boldsymbol{\alpha})}{{\rm d}t}$$
Impulse	Impulse is the change in momentum: $$\Delta \mathbf{p} = \int \mathbf{F} \, dt$$ For constant force F: $$\Delta \mathbf{p} = \mathbf{F} \Delta t$$	Twirl/angular impulse is the change in angular momentum: $$\Delta \mathbf{L} = \int \boldsymbol{\tau} \, dt$$ For constant torque τ: $$\Delta \mathbf{L} = \boldsymbol{\tau} \Delta t$$

=== Precession ===
The precession angular speed of a spinning top is given by:

$$\boldsymbol{\Omega} = \frac{wr}{I\boldsymbol{\omega}}$$

where w is the weight of the spinning flywheel.

== Energy ==
The mechanical work done by an external agent on a system is equal to the change in kinetic energy of the system:

=== General work-energy theorem (translation and rotation) ===
The work done W by an external agent which exerts a force F (at r) and torque τ on an object along a curved path C is:

$$W = \Delta T = \int_C \left ( \mathbf{F} \cdot \mathrm{d} \mathbf{r} + \boldsymbol{\tau} \cdot \mathbf{n} \, {\mathrm{d} \theta} \right )$$

where θ is the angle of rotation about an axis defined by a unit vector n.

=== Kinetic energy ===
The change in kinetic energy for an object initially traveling at speed $v_0$ and later at speed $v$ is:
$$\Delta E_k = W = \frac{1}{2} m(v^2 - {v_0}^2)$$

=== Elastic potential energy ===
For a stretched spring fixed at one end obeying Hooke's law, the elastic potential energy is

$$\Delta E_p =  \frac{1}{2} k(r_2-r_1)^2$$

where r_{2} and r_{1} are collinear coordinates of the free end of the spring, in the direction of the extension/compression, and k is the spring constant.

== Euler's equations for rigid body dynamics ==
Euler also worked out analogous laws of motion to those of Newton, see Euler's laws of motion. These extend the scope of Newton's laws to rigid bodies, but are essentially the same as above. A new equation Euler formulated is:

$$\mathbf{I} \cdot \boldsymbol{\alpha} + \boldsymbol{\omega} \times \left ( \mathbf{I} \cdot \boldsymbol{\omega} \right ) = \boldsymbol{\tau}$$

where I is the moment of inertia tensor.

== General planar motion ==
The previous equations for planar motion can be used here: corollaries of momentum, angular momentum etc. can immediately follow by applying the above definitions. For any object moving in any path in a plane,

$$\mathbf{r} = \mathbf{r}(t) = r\hat\mathbf r$$

the following general results apply to the particle.

Kinematics	Dynamics
Position $$\mathbf{r} =\mathbf{r}\left ( r,\theta, t \right ) = r \hat\mathbf r$$	
Velocity $$\mathbf{v} = \hat\mathbf r \frac{\mathrm{d} r}{\mathrm{d}t} + r \omega \hat\mathbf\theta$$	Momentum $$\mathbf{p} = m \left(\hat\mathbf r \frac{\mathrm{d} r}{\mathrm{d}t} + r \omega \hat\mathbf\theta \right)$$ Angular momenta $$\mathbf{L} = m \mathbf{r}\times \left(\hat\mathbf{r} \frac{\mathrm{d} r}{\mathrm{d}t} + r\omega\hat\mathbf\theta\right)$$
Acceleration $$\mathbf{a} =\left ( \frac{\mathrm{d}^2 r}{\mathrm{d}t^2} - r\omega^2\right )\hat\mathbf r + \left ( r \alpha + 2 \omega \frac{\mathrm{d}r}{{\rm d}t} \right )\hat\mathbf\theta$$	The centripetal force is $$\mathbf{F}_\bot = - m \omega^2 R \hat\mathbf r= - \omega^2 \mathbf{m}$$ where again m is the mass moment, and the Coriolis force is $$\mathbf{F}_c = 2\omega m \frac{{\rm d}r}{{\rm d}t} \hat\mathbf\theta = 2\omega m v \hat\mathbf\theta$$ The Coriolis acceleration and force can also be written: $$\mathbf{F}_c = m\mathbf{a}_c = -2 m \boldsymbol{ \omega \times v}$$

=== Central force motion ===
For a massive body moving in a central potential due to another object, which depends only on the radial separation between the centers of masses of the two objects, the equation of motion is:

$$\frac{d^2}{d\theta^2}\left(\frac{1}{\mathbf{r}}\right) + \frac{1}{\mathbf{r}} = -\frac{\mu\mathbf{r}^2}{\mathbf{l}^2}\mathbf{F}(\mathbf{r})$$

== Equations of motion (constant acceleration) ==
These equations can be used only when acceleration is constant. If acceleration is not constant then the general calculus equations above must be used, found by integrating the definitions of position, velocity and acceleration (see above).

Linear motion	Angular motion
$\mathbf{v-v_0}=\mathbf at$	$\boldsymbol{\omega - \omega_0} = \boldsymbol\alpha t$
$\mathbf{x - x_0} = \tfrac{1}{2}(\mathbf{v_0+v})t$	$\boldsymbol{\theta - \theta_0} = \tfrac{1}{2}(\boldsymbol{\omega_0 + \omega})t$
$\mathbf{x - x_0} = \mathbf v_0t + \tfrac{1}{2}\mathbf at^2$	$\boldsymbol{\theta - \theta_0} = \boldsymbol\omega _0 t + \tfrac{1}{2} \boldsymbol\alpha t^2$
$\mathbf{x - x_0} = \mathbf vt - \tfrac{1}{2}\mathbf at^2$	$\boldsymbol{\theta - \theta_0} = \boldsymbol\omega t - \tfrac{1}{2} \boldsymbol\alpha t^2$
$\mathbf x_{n^{th}} = \mathbf v_0 + \mathbf a(n-\tfrac{1}{2})$	$\boldsymbol\theta_{n^{th}} =\boldsymbol\omega_0+\boldsymbol\alpha(n-\tfrac{1}{2})$
$v^2 - v_0^2 = 2\mathbf{a(x-x_0)}$	$\omega^2 - \omega_0^2 = 2\boldsymbol{\alpha(\theta-\theta_0)}$

== Galilean frame transforms ==
For classical (Galileo-Newtonian) mechanics, the transformation law from one inertial or accelerating (including rotation) frame (reference frame traveling at constant velocity - including zero) to another is the Galilean transform.

Unprimed quantities refer to position, velocity and acceleration in one frame F; primed quantities refer to position, velocity and acceleration in another frame F' moving at translational velocity V or angular velocity Ω relative to F. Conversely F moves at velocity (—V or —Ω) relative to F'. The situation is similar for relative accelerations.

Motion of entities	Inertial frames	Accelerating frames
Translation V = Constant relative velocity between two inertial frames F and F'. A = (Variable) relative acceleration between two accelerating frames F and F'.	Relative position $$\mathbf{r}' = \mathbf{r} + \mathbf{V}t$$ Relative velocity $$\mathbf{v}' = \mathbf{v} + \mathbf{V}$$ Equivalent accelerations $$\mathbf{a}' = \mathbf{a}$$	Relative accelerations $$\mathbf{a}' = \mathbf{a} + \mathbf{A}$$ Apparent/fictitious forces $$\mathbf{F}' = \mathbf{F} - \mathbf{F}_\mathrm{app}$$
Rotation Ω = Constant relative angular velocity between two frames F and F'. Λ = (Variable) relative angular acceleration between two accelerating frames F and F'.	Relative angular position $$\theta' = \theta + \Omega t$$ Relative velocity $$\boldsymbol{\omega}' = \boldsymbol{\omega} + \boldsymbol{\Omega}$$ Equivalent accelerations $$\boldsymbol{\alpha}' = \boldsymbol{\alpha}$$	Relative accelerations $$\boldsymbol{\alpha}' = \boldsymbol{\alpha} + \boldsymbol{\Lambda}$$ Apparent/fictitious torques $$\boldsymbol{\tau}' = \boldsymbol{\tau} - \boldsymbol{\tau}_\mathrm{app}$$
Rotation Ω = Constant relative angular velocity between two frames F and F'. Λ = (Variable) relative angular acceleration between two accelerating frames F and F'.	Transformation of any vector T to a rotating frame $$\frac{{\rm d}\mathbf{T}'}{{\rm d}t} = \frac{{\rm d}\mathbf{T}}{{\rm d}t} - \boldsymbol{\Omega} \times \mathbf{T}$$	

== Mechanical oscillators ==
SHM, DHM, SHO, and DHO refer to simple harmonic motion, damped harmonic motion, simple harmonic oscillator and damped harmonic oscillator respectively.

Equations of motion
Physical situation	Nomenclature	Translational equations	Angular equations
SHM	x = Transverse displacement; θ = Angular displacement; A = Transverse amplitude; Θ = Angular amplitude	$$\frac{\mathrm{d}^2 x}{\mathrm{d}t^2} = - \omega^2 x$$ Solution: $$x = A \sin\left ( \omega t + \phi \right )$$	$$\frac{\mathrm{d}^2 \theta}{\mathrm{d}t^2} = - \omega^2 \theta$$ Solution: $$\theta = \Theta \sin\left ( \omega t + \phi \right )$$
Unforced DHM	b = damping constant; κ = torsion constant	$$\frac{\mathrm{d}^2 x}{\mathrm{d}t^2} + b \frac{\mathrm{d}x}{\mathrm{d}t} + \omega^2 x = 0$$ Solution (see below for ω'): $$x=Ae^{-bt/2m}\cos\left ( \omega' \right )$$ Resonant frequency: $$\omega_\mathrm{res} = \sqrt{\omega^2 - \left ( \frac{b}{4m} \right )^2 }$$ Damping rate: $$\gamma = b/m$$ Expected lifetime of excitation: $$\tau = 1/\gamma$$	$$\frac{\mathrm{d}^2 \theta}{\mathrm{d}t^2} + b \frac{\mathrm{d}\theta}{\mathrm{d}t} + \omega^2 \theta = 0$$ Solution: $$\theta=\Theta e^{-\kappa t/2m}\cos\left ( \omega \right )$$ Resonant frequency: $$\omega_\mathrm{res} = \sqrt{\omega^2 - \left ( \frac{\kappa}{4m} \right )^2 }$$ Damping rate: $$\gamma = \kappa/m$$ Expected lifetime of excitation: $$\tau = 1/\gamma$$

Angular frequencies
Physical situation	Nomenclature	Equations
Linear undamped unforced SHO	k = spring constant; m = mass of oscillating bob	$\omega = \sqrt{\frac{k}{m}}$
Linear unforced DHO	k = spring constant; b = Damping coefficient	$\omega' = \sqrt{\frac{k}{m}-\left ( \frac{b}{2m} \right )^2 }$
Low amplitude angular SHO	I = Moment of inertia about oscillating axis; κ = torsion constant	$\omega = \sqrt{\frac{\kappa}{I}}$
Low amplitude simple pendulum	L = Length of pendulum; g = Gravitational acceleration; Θ = Angular amplitude	Approximate value $$\omega = \sqrt{\frac{g}{L}}$$ Exact value can be shown to be: $$\omega = \sqrt{\frac{g}{L}} \left [ 1 + \sum_{k=1}^\infty \frac{\prod_{n=1}^k \left ( 2n-1 \right )}{\prod_{n=1}^m \left ( 2n \right )} \sin^{2n} \Theta \right ]$$

Energy in mechanical oscillations
Physical situation	Nomenclature	Equations
SHM energy	T = kinetic energy; U = potential energy; E = total energy	Potential energy $$U = \frac{m}{2} \left ( x \right )^2 = \frac{m \left( \omega A \right )^2}{2} \cos^2(\omega t + \phi)$$ Maximum value at x = A: $$U_\mathrm{max} = \frac{m}{2} \left ( \omega A \right )^2$$ Kinetic energy $$T = \frac{\omega^2 m}{2} \left ( \frac{\mathrm{d} x}{\mathrm{d} t} \right )^2 = \frac{m \left ( \omega A \right )^2}{2}\sin^2\left ( \omega t + \phi \right )$$ Total energy $$E = T + U$$
DHM energy		$E = \frac{m \left ( \omega A \right )^2}{2}e^{-bt/m}$

== See also ==
- List of physics formulae
- Defining equation (physical chemistry)
- Constitutive equation
- Mechanics
- Optics
- Electromagnetism
- Thermodynamics
- Acoustics
- Isaac Newton
- List of equations in wave theory
- List of relativistic equations
- List of equations in fluid mechanics
- List of equations in gravitation
- List of electromagnetism equations
- List of photonics equations
- List of equations in quantum mechanics
- List of equations in nuclear and particle physics

== Notes ==
Linear/translational quantities				Angular/rotational quantities			
Dimensions	1	L	L^{2}	Dimensions	1	θ	θ^{2}
T	time: t s	absement: A m s		T	time: t s		
1		distance: d, position: r, s, x, displacement m	area: A m^{2}	1		angle: θ, angular displacement: θ rad	solid angle: Ω rad^{2}, sr
T^{−1}	frequency: f s^{−1}, Hz	speed: v, velocity: v m s^{−1}	kinematic viscosity: ν, specific angular momentum: h m^{2} s^{−1}	T^{−1}	frequency: f, rotational speed: n, rotational velocity: n s^{−1}, Hz	angular speed: ω, angular velocity: ω rad s^{−1}	
T^{−2}		acceleration: a m s^{−2}		T^{−2}	rotational acceleration s^{−2}	angular acceleration: α rad s^{−2}	
T^{−3}		jerk: j m s^{−3}		T^{−3}		angular jerk: ζ rad s^{−3}	
M	mass: m kg	weighted position: M ⟨x⟩ = ∑ m x	moment of inertia: I kg m^{2}	ML			
MT^{−1}	Mass flow rate: $\dot{m}$ kg s^{−1}	momentum: p, impulse: J kg m s^{−1}, N s	action: 𝒮, actergy: ℵ kg m^{2} s^{−1}, J s	MLT^{−1}		angular momentum: L, angular impulse: ΔL kg m rad s^{−1}	
MT^{−2}		force: F, weight: F_{g} kg m s^{−2}, N	energy: E, work: W, Lagrangian: L kg m^{2} s^{−2}, J	MLT^{−2}		torque: τ, moment: M kg m rad s^{−2}, N m	
MT^{−3}		yank: Y kg m s^{−3}, N s^{−1}	power: P kg m^{2} s^{−3}, W	MLT^{−3}		rotatum: P kg m rad s^{−3}, N m s^{−1}	
