= Snap, Crackle and Pop =

Kellogg's cereal advertising mascots

Snap, Crackle, and Pop
- An older version of the three mascots
- First appearance: 1933
- Created by: Vernon Grant
- Voiced by: Snap: Len Dresslar (1960–1969); Daws Butler (1974–1980); Don Messick (1980–1990); Thom Adcox-Hernandez (1994-1999); Phil Vischer (2000-2009); Andy Hirsch (2009–present); Crackle: Don Shelton (1960–1969); Paul Winchell (1974–1981); Frank Welker (1984–1987); Keith Chegwin (1987–1990); Mona Marshall (1994-1999); Chad Doreck (2000–2009); Danny Cooksey (2009–present); Pop: Joe Silvia (1960–1969); Don Messick (1980–1989); Eddie Deezen (1990–1999); Dino Andrade (2000–2009); Mark Ballou (2009–present)

In-universe information
- Species: Elves
- Gender: Male
- Occupation: Mascots of Rice Krispies

Snap, Crackle and Pop are the cartoon mascots of Rice Krispies, a brand of breakfast cereal marketed by Kellogg's and its successor companies WK Kellogg Co and Kellanova.

== History ==
The characters were originally designed by illustrator Vernon Grant in the early 1930s. The names are onomatopoeia and were derived from a Rice Krispies radio ad:

Listen to the fairy song of health, the merry chorus sung by Kellogg's Rice Krispies as they merrily snap, crackle and pop in a bowl of milk. If you've never heard food talking, now is your chance.

The first character appeared on the product's packaging in 1933. Grant added two more and named the trio Snap, Crackle and Pop. Snap is usually portrayed wearing a chef's toque. Crackle often is shown wearing a red (or striped) tomte's tuque or "sleeping cap", and Pop often wears a drum major's shako, but is sometimes also seen with a chef's toque, or an odd combination of both a shako and a toque. Corporate promotional material describes their relationship as resembling that of brothers. Snap is the oldest and is known as a problem solver, Crackle is an unsure "middle child" and known as a jokester, and Pop is a mischievous yet also clumsy youngster and the center of attention. There was briefly a fourth elf in the 1950s named Pow who represented the claimed explosive nutritional value of Rice Krispies.

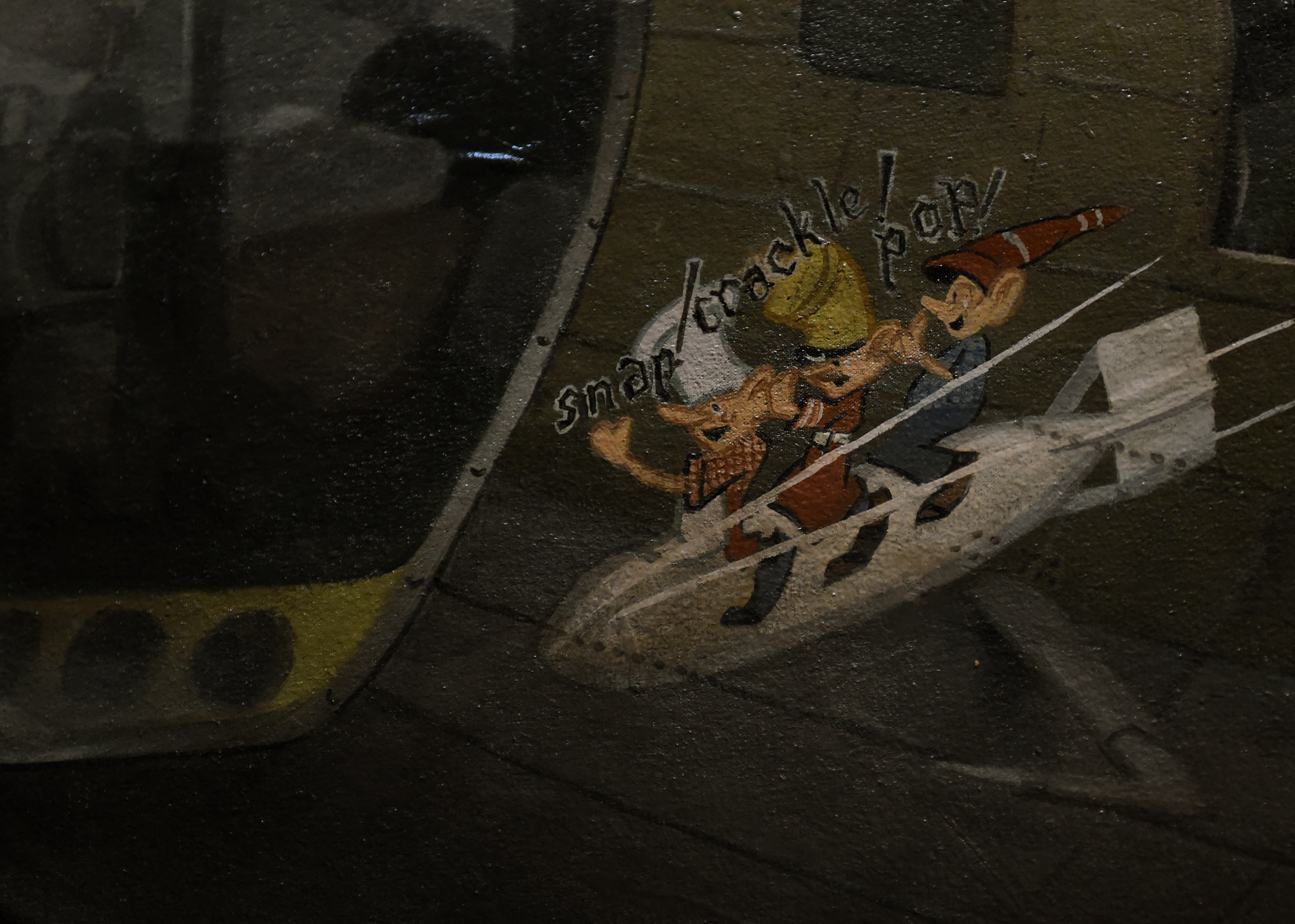
Nose art on a Boeing B-17 Flying Fortress depicting Snap, Crackle and Pop

From their original design as elderly gnomes with large noses, ears and hats, Snap, Crackle and Pop were reimagined with younger and more proportional features in 1949. Some time after 1955, their elf-like oversized ears became more proportional yet pointed, as seen in common portrayals of elves. They first appeared as animated characters in 1955, targeted toward such children's shows as The Howdy Doody Show. The voices of the original elves were provided by Len Dresslar, Don Shelton, and Joe Silvia. More recent voices have included Daws Butler, Paul Winchell, Don Messick, Joel Cory, Keith Chegwin, Chad Doreck, Eddie Deezen, Thom Adcox-Hernandez, Mona Marshall, Phil Vischer, Mike Nawrocki, and Dino Andrade. Since 2009, the three elves are voiced by Andy Hirsch (Snap), Danny Cooksey (Crackle) and Mark Ballou (Pop).

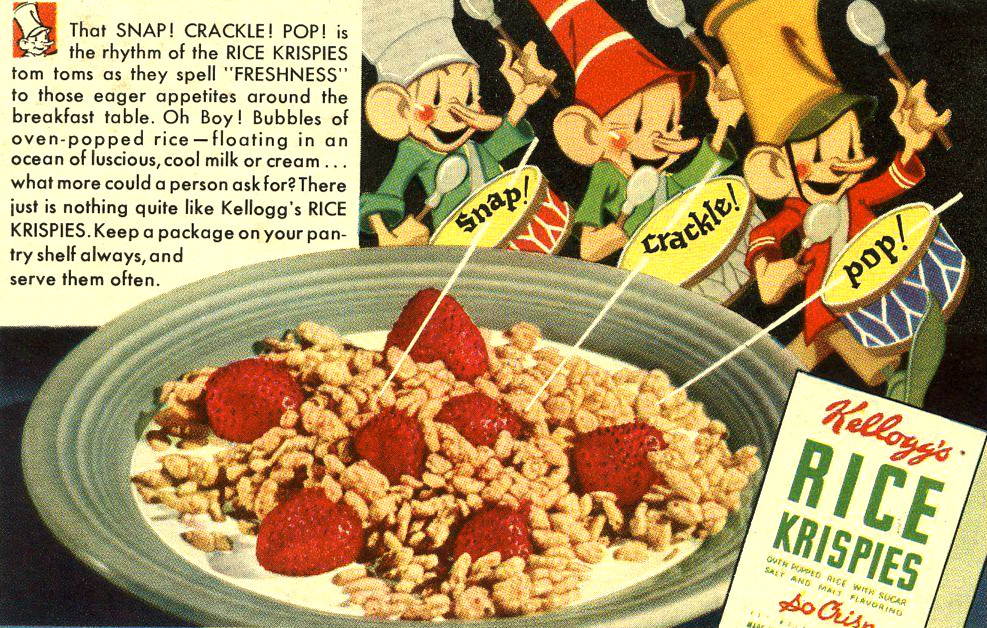
An early advertisement for Kellogg's Rice Krispies cereal featuring the original Snap, Crackle, and Pop characters.

The trio were used in conservation messages during World War II and briefly re-imagined as superheroes in the early 1990s, but later returned to their original gnome/elf-like form. In the 1950s – 1970's the characters were drawn by illustrator, Pete Eaton of Eaton and Iwen Art for Advertising. Leo Burnett Worldwide assigned Chicago-based cartoonist Don Margolis to do Snap, Crackle and Pop for the Rice Krispies boxes as well as other applications. Davidson Marketing also used him for their Rice Krispies assignments. Don did the three elves until the end of 1998.

On 17 June 2020, former UK Labour politician Fiona Onasanya questioned why popular breakfast cereal Coco Pops was promoted with a monkey, while Rice Krispies used the white-skinned Snap, Crackle and Pop.

The original advertising jingle, "Snap, Crackle, Pop", was written by Nick Winkless under the banner of Leo Burnett Worldwide. The lead sheet sent by Kellogg's lists the singers' names as Len, Hazel, and Joe. Nick's daughter said Nick's influence for the 3-part round was Fugue for Tinhorns from Guys and Dolls.

== Physics ==
In physics, the terms snap, crackle and pop are sometimes used to describe the fourth, fifth and sixth time derivatives of position. The first derivative of position with respect to time is velocity, the second is acceleration, and the third is jerk.
