= Mr. Mixie Dough =

Children's book by Vernon Grant

Mr. Mixie Dough: The Baker Man is a children's book written and illustrated by Vernon Grant (1902–1990). It was first published in 1934 by Whitman Publishing of Racine, Wisconsin. The book is a hardcover, large format (12.5" x 9.5"), with 20 double-sided heavyweight paper pages and often bound with thread and tape. The story is of a "Goof" (looks like an 'elf', and drawn not unlike the Snap, Crackle and Pop characters Grant drew for Kellogg's). Mr. Mixie Dough "makes bread and cakes and rolls and big-round cookies. Sometime he makes birthday cakes too, the kind with candles and colored candies on."

== Synopsis ==
The story is about Mr. Mixie Dough, who "lives away up in the sky in a place called "Behind-The-Clouds-Town". But unhappiness creeps over the town because the King Misty "cannot get a Happiness cake for his little boy's birthday." Mr. Mixie Dough, along with all of the other bakers, compete in making a "Happiness birthday cake" for the King's son's birthday. Many bakers offer their cakes to the King only to find that he is not happy with the result. That is until Mr. Mixie Dough presents his cake. The King smiled after the very first bite and announced "SIR Mixie Dough, the baker man... shall be made Royal Baker to the King and shall bake us a Happiness cake every day."

There are short sing-songs throughout the story and a recipe for the Happiness Cake.

Much of the book is made up of full-page drawings of colorful Goofs preparing and baking the Happiness cake for King Misty. Pictographs appear between words (such as a drawing of clouds after the word clouds; a silhouette of Mr. Mixie Dough).
