= Rice Krispies Treats =

Sweet dessert or snack

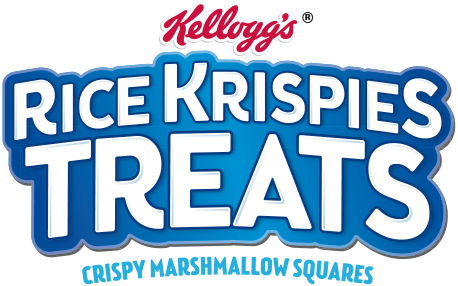

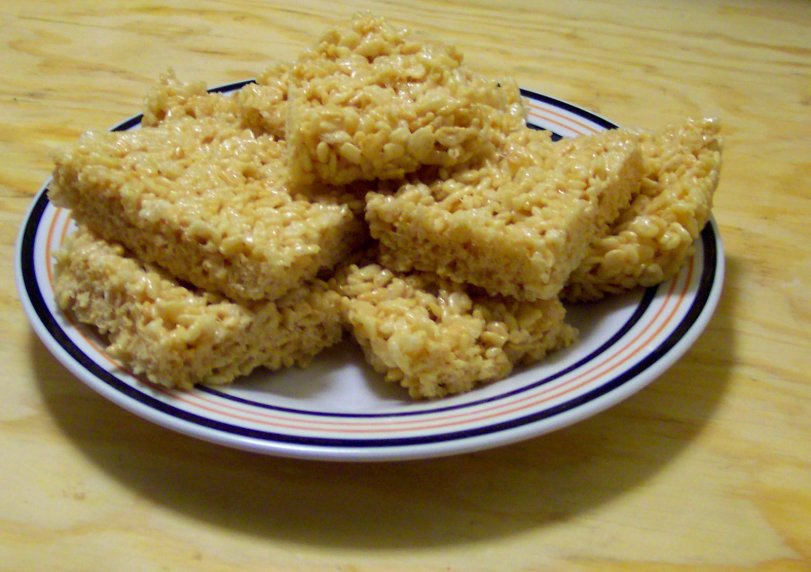
- Product type: Confection
- Current owner: Kellanova
- Country: United States
- Introduced: 1939; 87 years ago
- Related brands: Rice Krispies
- Website: kelloggs.com/ricekrispies

Rice Krispies Treats (also called Rice Krispie Treats, Marshmallow Treats, Marshmallow Squares, or Rice Krispies Squares in the United Kingdom & Canada, and LCMs in Australia) are a confection commonly made through binding WK Kellogg Co's Rice Krispies or another crisp rice cereal together with butter or margarine and marshmallow. Though they are traditionally home-made, Kellogg's began to market the treats themselves in 1995. Rice Krispies Treats products are currently manufactured and marketed by Kellanova.

== History ==
Rice Krispies Treats were invented in 1939 by Kellogg Company employees Malitta Jensen and Mildred Day "in the Kellogg kitchens in Battle Creek, Michigan as a promotional vehicle for the cereal." By the fall of 1940, the recipe was being publicized by Kellogg's in advertising for supermarkets and newspapers. In 1941, the name was changed by Kellogg's to "Rice Krispies Marshmallow Squares."

By 1950, Kellogg's published the recipe only slightly changed (1/4 cup butter, 1/2 pound marshmallows, 1/2 teaspoon vanilla, 5 cups of Rice Krispies). By 1955 Kellogg's advertised the confection as "Marshmallow Crispy Treats," listed margarine as alternative to the butter, and eliminated the vanilla (1/4 cup butter or margarine, 1/2 pound marshmallows, 5 cups of Rice Krispies).

Kellogg's began commercially to produce plain and chocolate-based treats under the trademark brand-names of "Rice Krispies Treats" (in the United States and Mexico), "Squares" (in Canada, the United Kingdom and Ireland) and "LCMs" (in Australia and New Zealand) in 1995; however, other manufacturers had offered similar products under variant names (such as "Crisped Rice Treats" or "Marshmallow Treats") prior to this. Kellogg's also offered a breakfast cereal based on the confection from the 1990s until their discontinuation in 2020.

== See also ==
- Arare (food)
- Cakcak
- Chocolate crackles
- Sachima
- Rengginang
- White Christmas (food)
