= Flounce =

Flounce may refer to:

- Flounce (fabric), particular type of fabric manipulation that creates a similar look to ruffle but with less bulk
- Flounce (physics) or crackle, in physics, the fifth derivative of the position vector with respect to time
