= Vernon Simeon Plemion Grant =

American illustrator

Vernon Grant
- Born: Vernon Simeon Plemion Grant; April 26, 1902; Coleridge, Nebraska
- Died: July 9, 1990 (aged 88); Rock Hill, South Carolina
- Education: Art Institute of Chicago
- Known for: illustrator, Cartoonist
- Notable work: Kelloggs Snap!, Crackle! and Pop!

Vernon Simeon Plemion Grant (April 26, 1902 – July 9, 1990) was an American illustrator known for his whimsical gnome characters and fairy tale drawings. Over seven decades, Grant created hundreds of illustrations for advertising (General Electric, Gillette, Hershey's. Kellogg's) and major magazines, including Judge and Ladies' Home Journal. He is best known as creator of Kellogg's Rice Krispies cereal characters Snap! Crackle! and Pop!

== Biography ==
=== Early life and education ===
Grant was born on April 26, 1902, in Coleridge, Nebraska, to Oliver Simeon Grant and Chloe Barkley Grant. When Grant was six years old, his family moved to South Dakota where they homesteaded. His experiences living on the prairies served as the inspiration for many of the artworks he would create throughout his career. While there he also learned illustration techniques from his beloved school teacher cousin Nellie Grant. As a teen, Grant moved with his family to California. He studied business law and public speaking at the University of Southern California and, at age 21, enrolled in the Art Institute of Chicago. To help pay for his education, Grant developed his chalk talks, which became a popular act on the vaudeville circuit.

=== Illustrations ===
In 1932, a Grant Santa Claus illustration was used for the cover of Ladies' Home Journal. The next year, a radio commercial for Kellogg's Rice Krispies inspired the gnome-like mascots Snap! Crackle! and Pop! He soon became the lead illustrator for Kellogg's products, becoming so popular that in 1935 the company sent him on a world tour to promote their cereals.

In the 1930s and 1940s Grant became one of the country's most popular and prolific illustrator of children's fairy tales, creating at least ten booklets and 25 individual prints. He did covers for Judge, Collier's and other magazines. In 1938, Life magazine ranked Grant as "America's favorite children's artist."

Grant worked with the USO during World War II, entertaining troops with sketches and fast-paced chalk talks. After the war, he moved to South Carolina while still working for New York clients.

=== South Carolina farming ===
Vernon Grant's cover for Judge (March 19, 1932)

In 1936, Grant met and married Elizabeth Fewell, a native of Rock Hill, South Carolina. They had two children, son Chip and daughter Kay. In 1947, Grant and his family established a 670-acre (2.7 km^{2}) farm outside Rock Hill, raising Angus cattle and Concord grapes. Grant became active in farming organizations, and his farming practices were recognized with awards from state agricultural associations.

In the late 1950s, Grant led the Rock Hill Chamber of Commerce, promoting changes in city planning and public housing. He served as the city's first director of public housing from 1965 to 1971.

Grant continued making art until, in 1985, he felt he could no longer work to his own expectations and was forced to retire. When he died in 1990 at age 88, the Charlotte Observer noted that although Grant's illustrations would delight people for years, "in the long run his greatest gift to the community may be the standard of citizenship he exemplified."

== Influence and legacy ==
In his book Great Cartoonists and Their Art, political cartoonist Art Wood wrote:

His style was distinctive and influenced such diverse artisans as Walt Disney, Russell Patterson, Don Flowers and Walt Scott in this country. His drawings also influenced Antonio Arias Bernal, one of Mexico's leading caricaturists. He had a gift for color, and his vivid poster-like paintings decorated children's rooms around the world. ... While Grant's work was imitated, it was never emulated.

=== Archives ===
The Museum of York County has exhibited Grant's artwork since 1979. A permanent Vernon Grant Gallery was established at the Museum in 1990. In 2006, the Grant's family donated a collection of more than 1,000 items, including scrapbooks, studio furniture and original artwork, to the Culture & Heritage Museums which manages the Museum of York County. The Museum gift shop sells merchandise based on Grant art, including limited edition prints, books, Christmas ornaments, coloring books and playing cards.

Kellogg's Archives houses another substantial collection of original Grant artwork. In 1993, Kellogg's gave the Museum of York County reproduction rights to produce merchandise of art featured in the exhibition "Seventy-five Years of Gnomes and Folks—A Tribute to Grant's Career".

=== Festivals ===
In the early 1960s, the city of Rock Hill created its Come-See-Me festival to feature the city's Glencairn Garden, with an owl drawn by Grant as a mascot. In 1965, Grant created Glen the Frog, which has been the festival mascot ever since. A new festival, ChristmasVille, was begun in Rock Hill in 2006. The festival spotlights Grant's many Santa Claus and winter illustrations. The festival mascot is Grant the Gnome.

== Bibliography ==
Children's books written and/or illustrated by Vernon Grant.

Date	Description
1933	Mother Goose as told by Kellogg's Singing Lady
1933	Singing Lady Songbook—Mail offer from Kellogg
Circa 1933	World's Best Loved Stories and Songs—Mail offer from Kellogg
1934	Tinker Tim the Toymaker—Published by Whitman
1934	Mr. Mixie-Dough—Published by Whitman
1935	Mother Goose as told by Kellogg's Singing Lady—Mail offer from Kellogg
1942	Bilda-Zoo—contains 25 illustrations and 16 pages; co-written with Jack Eisner; Kindred, MacLean and Co., Publishing
1943	Flibbity Jibbitt—Mail offer from Junket Rennett Custard Company
1944	The Cow and the Silver Cream—Mail offer from Wright Silver Cream Company
1965	Easter Coloring Book—Published by Smith Enterprises of Rock Hill, SC
1998	Vernon Grant's Mother Goose—Published by the Museum of York County/Harry N. Abrams

== General and cited sources ==
- Miller, Allan; Linda Williams (1987). A Biographical Sketch of Illustrator Vernon Grant. Rock Hill, South Carolina: Museum of York County.
- Miller, Allan (1991). A Collector's Guide on Illustrator Vernon Grant. Rock Hill, South Carolina: Museum of York County.
