= Copha =

Vegetable shortening made from hydrogenated coconut oil

Copha, a registered trademark of Peerless Foods under license from Unilever and Upfield, is a form of vegetable fat shortening made from hydrogenated coconut oil. Copha is produced exclusively in Australia. It is 100% fat, at least 98% of which is saturated. It also contains soybean lecithin.

It is used in Australia for confectionery, such as rocky road, and a number of foods for children, being an essential ingredient in white Christmas, and in chocolate crackles, which are made from Rice Bubbles, copha and cocoa powder. It is also used as a "chocolate coating" on baked goods, that amounts to a form of compound chocolate.

Concern about the health hazards of hydrogenated fats (trans fats) is a contributor to the declining popularity of Copha-based confectionery.

In New Zealand, it is marketed as Kremelta. Known in Europe as coconut fat, it is available either in its pure form, or in solid form with lecithin added as an emulsifier. In France it is marketed as Végétaline and in Germany and Denmark it is marketed as Palmin. It is not readily available in the United States.

== See also ==
- Hydrogenation
- Coconut oil
- Saturated fat
- Shortening
