= Acceleration (differential geometry) =

In mathematics and physics, acceleration is the rate of change of velocity of a curve with respect to a given linear connection. This operation provides us with a measure of the rate and direction of the "bend".

== Formal definition ==
Let be given a differentiable manifold $M$, considered as spacetime (not only space), with a connection $\Gamma$. Let $\gamma \colon\R \to M$ be a curve in $M$ with tangent vector, i.e. (spacetime) velocity, ${\dot\gamma}(\tau)$, with parameter $\tau$.

The (spacetime) acceleration vector of $\gamma$ is defined by $\nabla_{\dot\gamma}{\dot\gamma}$, where $\nabla$ denotes the covariant derivative associated to $\Gamma$.

It is a covariant derivative along $\gamma$, and it is often denoted by

$$\nabla_{\dot\gamma}{\dot\gamma} =\frac{\nabla\dot\gamma}{d\tau}.$$

With respect to an arbitrary coordinate system $(x^{\mu})$, and with $(\Gamma^{\lambda}{}_{\mu\nu})$ being the components of the connection (i.e., covariant derivative $\nabla_{\mu}:=\nabla_{\partial/\partial x^\mu}$) relative to this coordinate system, defined by

$$\nabla_{\partial/\partial x^\mu}\frac{\partial}{\partial x^{\nu}}= \Gamma^{\lambda}{}_{\mu\nu}\frac{\partial}{\partial x^{\lambda}},$$

for the acceleration vector field $a^{\mu}:=(\nabla_{\dot\gamma}{\dot\gamma})^{\mu}$ one gets:

$$a^{\mu}=v^{\rho}\nabla_{\rho}v^{\mu} =\frac{dv^{\mu}}{d\tau}+ \Gamma^{\mu}{}_{\nu\lambda}v^{\nu}v^{\lambda}= \frac{d^2x^{\mu}}{d\tau^2}+ \Gamma^{\mu}{}_{\nu\lambda}\frac{dx^{\nu}}{d\tau}\frac{dx^{\lambda}}{d\tau},$$

where $x^{\mu}(\tau):= \gamma^{\mu}(\tau)$ is the local expression for the path $\gamma$, and $v^{\rho}:=({\dot\gamma})^{\rho}$.

The concept of acceleration is a covariant derivative concept. In other words, in order to define acceleration an additional structure on $M$ must be given.

Using abstract index notation, the acceleration of a given curve with unit tangent vector $\xi^a$ is given by $\xi^{b}\nabla_{b}\xi^{a}$.

== See also ==
- Acceleration
- Covariant derivative
