= Fourth, fifth, and sixth derivatives of position =

Higher derivatives of the position vector with respect to time

Time-derivatives of position

In the physics field of kinematics, the fourth, fifth and sixth derivatives of position describe how an object's motion changes with time. Velocity is the first derivative of position; it describes how position changes with time. Acceleration is the second derivative of position; it describes how velocity changes with time. The third derivative is called jerk, and describes how acceleration changes with time. Similarly, each of the subsequent derivatives describes how the previous one changes with time.

The fourth derivative is referred to as snap, leading the fifth and sixth derivatives to be "sometimes somewhat facetiously" called crackle and pop, named after the Rice Krispies mascots of the same name. The fourth derivative is also called jounce. According to Don Eyles, a former NASA computer programmer, the use of snap, crackle, and pop for derivatives of jerk was suggested by NASA engineer Allan Klumpp during the Apollo Program. These higher-order derivatives are less common than the first three; thus their names are not as standardized, though the concept of a minimum snap trajectory has been used in robotics.

== Applications ==
Minimizing snap and jerk is useful in mechanical and civil engineering because it reduces vibrations and ensures smoother motion transitions. In civil engineering, railway tracks and roads are designed to limit snap, particularly around bends with varying radii of curvature. When snap is constant, the jerk changes linearly, producing a gradual increase in radial acceleration; when snap is zero, acceleration changes linearly. These profiles are often achieved using mathematical clothoid functions. The same principle is applied by roller coaster designers, who use smooth transitions in loops and helices to enhance ride comfort.

In mechanical engineering, controlling snap and jerk is important in fields such as automotive design, to prevent camfollowers from jumping off camshafts, and manufacturing, where rapid acceleration changes in cutting tools can cause premature tool wear and uneven surface finishes. Minimum-snap and minimum-jerk trajectories are also used in trajectory optimization in robotics. Minimum-snap trajectories for quadrotors can reduce control effort, while minimum-jerk trajectories for robotic manipulators produce predictable motions that improve control performance and facilitate human-robot interaction.

== Fourth derivative (snap or jounce) ==
Snap, or jounce, is the fourth derivative of the position vector with respect to time, or the rate of change of the jerk (the third derivative) with respect to time. Equivalently, it is the second derivative of acceleration or the third derivative of velocity, and is defined by any of the following equivalent expressions:

$$\mathbf{s} = \frac{\mathrm{d}\mathbf{j}}{\mathrm{d}t} = \frac{\mathrm{d}^2 \mathbf{a}}{\mathrm{d}t^2} = \frac{\mathrm{d}^3 \mathbf{v}}{\mathrm{d}t^3} = \frac{\mathrm{d}^4 \mathbf{r}}{\mathrm{d}t^4}.$$
The following equations are used for constant snap:
$$\begin{align}
\mathbf{j} &= \mathbf{j}_0 + \mathbf{s} t, \\
\mathbf{a} &= \mathbf{a}_0 + \mathbf{j}_0 t + \tfrac{1}{2} \mathbf{s} t^2, \\
\mathbf{v} &= \mathbf{v}_0 + \mathbf{a}_0 t + \tfrac{1}{2} \mathbf{j}_0 t^2 + \tfrac{1}{6} \mathbf{s} t^3, \\
\mathbf{r} &= \mathbf{r}_0 + \mathbf{v}_0 t + \tfrac{1}{2} \mathbf{a}_0 t^2 + \tfrac{1}{6} \mathbf{j}_0 t^3 + \tfrac{1}{24} \mathbf{s} t^4,
\end{align}$$

where

- $\mathbf{s}$ is constant snap,
- $\mathbf{j}_0$ is initial jerk,
- $\mathbf{j}$ is final jerk,
- $\mathbf{a}_0$ is initial acceleration,
- $\mathbf{a}$ is final acceleration,
- $\mathbf{v}_0$ is initial velocity,
- $\mathbf{v}$ is final velocity,
- $\mathbf{r}_0$ is initial position,
- $\mathbf{r}$ is final position,
- $t$ is time between initial and final states.

The notation $\mathbf{s}$ (used by Visser) is not to be confused with the displacement vector commonly denoted similarly.

The dimensions of snap are distance per fourth power of time [LT^{−4}]. The corresponding SI unit is metre per second to the fourth power, m/s^{4}, m⋅s^{−4}.

== Fifth derivative ==
The fifth derivative of the position vector with respect to time is sometimes referred to as crackle. It is the rate of change of snap (the fourth derivative) with respect to time. Crackle is defined by any of the following equivalent expressions:
$$\mathbf{c} =\frac {\mathrm{d} \mathbf{s}} {\mathrm{d}t} = \frac {\mathrm{d}^2 \mathbf{j}} {\mathrm{d}t^2} = \frac {\mathrm{d}^3 \mathbf{a}} {\mathrm{d}t^3} = \frac {\mathrm{d}^4 \mathbf{v}} {\mathrm{d}t^4}= \frac {\mathrm{d}^5 \mathbf{r}} {\mathrm{d}t^5}$$

The following equations are used for constant crackle:
$$\begin{align}
\mathbf{s} &= \mathbf{s}_0 + \mathbf{c} t \\[1ex]
\mathbf{j} &= \mathbf{j}_0 + \mathbf{s}_0 t + \tfrac{1}{2} \mathbf{c} t^2 \\[1ex]
\mathbf{a} &= \mathbf{a}_0 + \mathbf{j}_0 t + \tfrac{1}{2} \mathbf{s}_0 t^2 + \tfrac{1}{6} \mathbf{c} t^3 \\[1ex]
\mathbf{v} &= \mathbf{v}_0 + \mathbf{a}_0 t + \tfrac{1}{2} \mathbf{j}_0 t^2 + \tfrac{1}{6} \mathbf{s}_0 t^3 + \tfrac{1}{24} \mathbf{c} t^4 \\[1ex]
\mathbf{r} &= \mathbf{r}_0 + \mathbf{v}_0 t + \tfrac{1}{2} \mathbf{a}_0 t^2 + \tfrac{1}{6} \mathbf{j}_0 t^3 + \tfrac{1}{24} \mathbf{s}_0 t^4 + \tfrac{1}{120} \mathbf{c} t^5
\end{align}$$

where

- $\mathbf{c}$ : constant crackle,
- $\mathbf{s}_0$ : initial snap,
- $\mathbf{s}$ : final snap,
- $\mathbf{j}_0$ : initial jerk,
- $\mathbf{j}$ : final jerk,
- $\mathbf{a}_0$ : initial acceleration,
- $\mathbf{a}$ : final acceleration,
- $\mathbf{v}_0$ : initial velocity,
- $\mathbf{v}$ : final velocity,
- $\mathbf{r}_0$ : initial position,
- $\mathbf{r}$ : final position,
- $t$ : time between initial and final states.

The dimensions of crackle are [LT^{−5}]. The corresponding SI unit is m/s^{5}.

== Sixth derivative ==
The sixth derivative of the position vector with respect to time is sometimes referred to as pop. It is the rate of change of crackle (the fifth derivative) with respect to time. Pop is defined by any of the following equivalent expressions:

$$\mathbf{p} =\frac {\mathrm{d} \mathbf{c}} {\mathrm{d}t} = \frac {\mathrm{d}^2 \mathbf{s}} {\mathrm{d}t^2} = \frac {\mathrm{d}^3 \mathbf{j}} {\mathrm{d}t^3} = \frac {\mathrm{d}^4 \mathbf{a}} {\mathrm{d}t^4} = \frac {\mathrm{d}^5 \mathbf{v}} {\mathrm{d}t^5} = \frac {\mathrm{d}^6 \mathbf{r}} {\mathrm{d}t^6}$$

The following equations are used for constant pop:
$$\begin{align}
\mathbf{c} &= \mathbf{c}_0 + \mathbf{p} t \\
\mathbf{s} &= \mathbf{s}_0 + \mathbf{c}_0 t + \tfrac{1}{2} \mathbf{p} t^2 \\
\mathbf{j} &= \mathbf{j}_0 + \mathbf{s}_0 t + \tfrac{1}{2} \mathbf{c}_0 t^2 + \tfrac{1}{6} \mathbf{p} t^3 \\
\mathbf{a} &= \mathbf{a}_0 + \mathbf{j}_0 t + \tfrac{1}{2} \mathbf{s}_0 t^2 + \tfrac{1}{6} \mathbf{c}_0 t^3 + \tfrac{1}{24} \mathbf{p} t^4 \\
\mathbf{v} &= \mathbf{v}_0 + \mathbf{a}_0 t + \tfrac{1}{2} \mathbf{j}_0 t^2 + \tfrac{1}{6} \mathbf{s}_0 t^3 + \tfrac{1}{24} \mathbf{c}_0 t^4 + \tfrac{1}{120} \mathbf{p} t^5 \\
\mathbf{r} &= \mathbf{r}_0 + \mathbf{v}_0 t + \tfrac{1}{2} \mathbf{a}_0 t^2 + \tfrac{1}{6} \mathbf{j}_0 t^3 + \tfrac{1}{24} \mathbf{s}_0 t^4 + \tfrac{1}{120} \mathbf{c}_0 t^5 + \tfrac{1}{720} \mathbf{p} t^6
\end{align}$$

where

- $\mathbf{p}$ : constant pop,
- $\mathbf{c}_0$ : initial crackle,
- $\mathbf{c}$ : final crackle,
- $\mathbf{s}_0$ : initial snap,
- $\mathbf{s}$ : final snap,
- $\mathbf{j}_0$ : initial jerk,
- $\mathbf{j}$ : final jerk,
- $\mathbf{a}_0$ : initial acceleration,
- $\mathbf{a}$ : final acceleration,
- $\mathbf{v}_0$ : initial velocity,
- $\mathbf{v}$ : final velocity,
- $\mathbf{r}_0$ : initial position,
- $\mathbf{r}$ : final position,
- $t$ : time between initial and final states.

The dimensions of pop are [LT^{−6}]. The corresponding SI unit is m/s^{6}.
