= Orders of magnitude (acceleration) =

Comparison of a wide range of accelerations

This page lists examples of the acceleration occurring in various situations. They are grouped by orders of magnitude.

Factor [m/s^{2}]	Multiple	Reference frame	Value	[g]	Item
10^{−∞}	0 m/s^{2}	inertial	0 m/s^{2}	0 g	The gyro rotors in Gravity Probe B and the free-floating proof masses in the TRIAD I navigation satellite
10^{−∞}	0 m/s^{2}	inertial	≈ 0 m/s^{2}	≈ 0 g	Weightless parabola in a reduced-gravity aircraft
10^{−14}	10 fm/s^{2}	lab	5×10^{−14} m/s^{2}	5×10^{−15} g	Smallest acceleration in a scientific experiment
10^{−10}	100 pm/s^{2}	inertial	≈ 1×10^{−10} m/s^{2}	≈ 1×10^{−11} g	Typical gravitational acceleration of stars in the Milky Way
10^{−10}	100 pm/s^{2}	inertial	1.2×10^{−10} m/s^{2}	1.22×10^{−11} g	Constant $a_0$in Modified Newtonian dynamics theory, which states that objects with gravitational acceleration lower than $a_0$ don't follow Newton's law of gravity
10^{−3}	1 mm/s^{2}	Solar system	5.93×10^{−3} m/s^{2}	6.04×10^{−4} g	Acceleration of Earth toward the sun due to sun's gravitational attraction
10^{−1}	1 dm/s^{2}	lab	0.25 m/s^{2}	0.026 g	Train acceleration for SJ X2
10^{0}	1 m/s^{2}	inertial	1.62 m/s^{2}	0.1654 g	Standing on the Moon at its equator
10^{0}	1 m/s^{2}	lab	4.3 m/s^{2}	0.44 g	Car acceleration 0–100 km/h in 6.4 s with a Saab 9-5 Hirsch
10^{0}	1 m/s^{2}	inertial	9.80665 m/s^{2}	1 g	Standard gravity, the gravity acceleration on Earth at sea level standard
10^{1}	1 dam/s^{2}	inertial	11.2 m/s^{2}	1.14 g	Saturn V Moon rocket just after launch
10^{1}	1 dam/s^{2}	inertial	15.2 m/s^{2}	1.55 g	Bugatti Veyron from 0 to 100 km/h in 2.4 s (the net acceleration vector including gravitational acceleration is directed 40 degrees from horizontal)
10^{1}	1 dam/s^{2}	inertial	29 m/s^{2}	3 g	Space Shuttle, maximum during launch and reentry
10^{1}	1 dam/s^{2}	inertial	29 m/s^{2}	3 g	Sustainable for > 25 seconds, for a human
10^{1}	1 dam/s^{2}	inertial	34 – 49 m/s^{2}	3.5 – 5 g	High-G roller coasters
10^{1}	1 dam/s^{2}	lab?	41 m/s^{2}	4.2 g	Top Fuel drag racing world record of 4.4 s over 1/4 mile
10^{1}	1 dam/s^{2}	inertial	49 m/s^{2}	5 g	Causes disorientation, dizziness and fainting in humans
10^{1}	1 dam/s^{2}	lab?	49+ m/s^{2}	5+ g	Formula One car, maximum under heavy braking
10^{1}	1 dam/s^{2}	inertial?	51 m/s^{2}	5.2 g	Luge, maximum expected at the Whistler Sliding Centre
10^{1}	1 dam/s^{2}	lab	49 – 59 m/s^{2}	5 – 6 g	Formula One car, peak lateral in turns
10^{1}	1 dam/s^{2}	inertial	59 m/s^{2}	6 g	Parachutist peak during normal opening of parachute
10^{1}	1 dam/s^{2}	inertial	+69 / -49 m/s^{2}	+7 / -5 g	Standard, full aerobatics certified glider
10^{1}	1 dam/s^{2}	inertial	70.6 m/s^{2}	7.19 g	Apollo 16 on reentry
10^{1}	1 dam/s^{2}	inertial	79 m/s^{2}	8 g	F-16 aircraft pulling out of dive
10^{1}	1 dam/s^{2}	inertial	88 m/s^{2}	9 g	Maximum for a fit, trained person with G-suit to keep consciousness, avoiding G-LOC
10^{1}	1 dam/s^{2}	inertial	88 – 118 m/s^{2}	9 – 12 g	Typical maximum turn acceleration in an aerobatic plane or fighter jet
10^{2}	1 hm/s^{2}	inertial	147 m/s^{2}	15 g	Explosive seat ejection from aircraft
10^{2}	1 hm/s^{2}	inertial	177 m/s^{2}	18 g	Physical damage in humans, such as broken capillaries
10^{2}	1 hm/s^{2}	inertial	209 m/s^{2}	21.3 g	Peak acceleration experienced by cosmonauts during the Soyuz 18a abort
10^{2}	1 hm/s^{2}	inertial	333 m/s^{2}	34 g	Peak deceleration of the Stardust Sample Return Capsule on reentry to Earth
10^{2}	1 hm/s^{2}	inertial	454 m/s^{2}	46.2 g	Maximum acceleration a human has survived on a rocket sled
10^{2}	1 hm/s^{2}	inertial	> 491 m/s^{2}	> 50 g	Death or serious injury likely
10^{2}	1 hm/s^{2}	inertial	982 m/s^{2}	100 g	Sprint missile
10^{2}	1 hm/s^{2}	inertial	982 m/s^{2}	100 g	Automobile crash (100 km/h into wall)
10^{2}	1 hm/s^{2}	inertial	> 982 m/s^{2}	> 100 g	Brief human exposure survived in crash
10^{2}	1 hm/s^{2}	inertial	982 m/s^{2}	100 g	Deadly limit for most humans
10^{3}	1 km/s^{2}	inertial ≈ lab	1540 m/s^{2}	157 g	Peak acceleration of fastest rocket sled run
10^{3}	1 km/s^{2}	inertial ≈ lab	1964 m/s^{2}	200 g	3.5-inch hard disc non-operating shock tolerance for 2 ms, weight 0.6 kg
10^{3}	1 km/s^{2}	inertial ≈ lab	2098 m/s^{2}	214 g	Highest recorded amount of g-force exposed and survived by a human (Peak deceleration experienced by Kenny Bräck in a crash at the 2003 Chevy 500)
10^{3}	1 km/s^{2}	inertial ≈ lab	2256 m/s^{2}	230 g	Peak acceleration experience by the Galileo probe during descent into Jupiter's atmosphere
10^{3}	1 km/s^{2}	inertial ≈ lab	2490 m/s^{2}	254 g	Peak deceleration experienced by Jules Bianchi's head in crash of Marussia MR03, 2014 Japanese Grand Prix
10^{3}	1 km/s^{2}	inertial ≈ lab	2946 m/s^{2}	300 g	Soccer ball struck by foot
10^{3}	1 km/s^{2}	inertial ≈ lab	3200 m/s^{2}	320 g	A jumping human flea
10^{3}	1 km/s^{2}	inertial ≈ lab	3800 m/s^{2}	380 g	A jumping click beetle
10^{3}	1 km/s^{2}	inertial ≈ lab	4944 m/s^{2}	504 g	Clothes on washing machine, during dry spinning (46 cm drum at 1400 rpm)
10^{4}	10 km/s^{2}		11 768 m/s^{2}	1200 g	Deceleration of the head of a woodpecker
10^{4}	10 km/s^{2}		17 680 m/s^{2}	1800 g	Space gun with a barrel length of 1 km and a muzzle velocity of 6 km/s, as proposed by Quicklaunch (assuming constant acceleration)
10^{4}	10 km/s^{2}		29460 m/s^{2}	3000 g	Baseball struck by bat
10^{4}	10 km/s^{2}		~33 000 m/s^{2}	3400 g	Standard requirement for decelerative crashworthiness in certified flight recorders (black box)
10^{4}	10 km/s^{2}		>49 100 m/s^{2}	>5000 g	Shock capability of mechanical wrist watches
10^{4}	10 km/s^{2}		84 450 m/s^{2}	8600 g	Current Formula One engines, maximum piston acceleration (up to 10,000 g before rev limits)
10^{5}	100 km/s^{2}		102 000 m/s^{2}	10 400 g	A mantis shrimp punch
10^{5}	100 km/s^{2}		152 210 m/s^{2}	15 500 g	Rating of electronics built into military artillery shells
10^{5}	100 km/s^{2}		196 400 m/s^{2}	20 000 g	Spore acceleration of the Pilobolus fungi
10^{5}	100 km/s^{2}		304 420 m/s^{2}	31 000 g	9×19 mm Parabellum handgun bullet (average along the length of the barrel)
10^{6}	1,000 km/s^{2}		1 000 000 m/s^{2}	100 000 g	Closing jaws of a trap-jaw ant
10^{6}	1,000 km/s^{2}		1 865 800 m/s^{2}	190 000 g	9×19 mm Parabellum handgun bullet, peak
10^{6}	1,000 km/s^{2}		3 800 000 m/s^{2}	390 000 g	Surface gravity of white dwarf Sirius B
10^{6}	1,000 km/s^{2}		3 900 000 m/s^{2}	slightly below 400 000 g	Ultracentrifuge
10^{9}	1 million km/s^{2}		1×10^{9} m/s^{2}	~100 000 000 g	The record peak acceleration of a projectile in a coilgun, a 2-gram projectile accelerated in 1 cm from rest to 5 km/sec.
10^{12}	1 billion km/s^{2}		1×10^{12} to 1×10^{13} m/s^{2}	1×10^{11} to 1×10^{12} g	Surface gravity of a neutron star
10^{12}	1 billion km/s^{2}		2.1×10^{13} m/s^{2}	2.1×10^{12} g	Protons in the Large Hadron Collider
10^{21}	1 quintillion km/s^{2}		9.149×10^{21} m/s^{2}	9.33×10^{20} g	Classical (Bohr model) acceleration of an electron around a _{1}H nucleus.
10^{21}	1 quintillion km/s^{2}		1.76×10^{23} m/s^{2}	1.79×10^{22} g	Electrons in a 1 TV/m wakefield accelerator
10^{51}	1 quindecillion km/s^{2}		5.5608×10^{51} m/s^{2}	5.5719×10^{50} g	Coherent Planck unit of acceleration

== See also ==
- G-force
- Gravitational acceleration
- Mechanical shock
- Standard gravity
- International System of Units (SI)
- SI prefix
