= Chocolate crackles =

Confection in Australia and New Zealand made of puffed rice

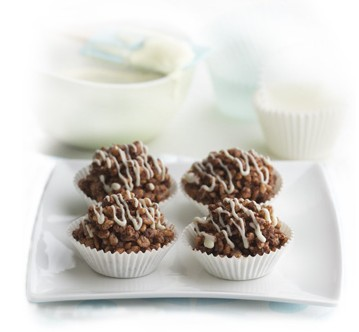
- Alternative names: Chocolate bubble cakes
- Place of origin: Australia, New Zealand
- Main ingredients: Rice Bubbles, desiccated coconut

Chocolate crackles (also known as chocolate bubble cakes) are a popular children's confection in Australia and New Zealand, especially for birthday parties and at school fêtes. The earliest recipe found so far is from The Australian Women's Weekly in December 1937.

The principal ingredient is the commercial breakfast cereal Rice Bubbles. The binding ingredient is hydrogenated coconut oil (such as the brand Copha), which is solid at room temperature. Since making chocolate crackles does not require baking it is often used as an activity for young children.

== Recipe ==
The recipe is relatively easy requiring only vegetable shortening, icing sugar, cocoa, desiccated coconut and Rice Bubbles (or Coco Pops). The hydrogenated oil is melted and combined with the dry ingredients and portions of the mixture are placed in cupcake pans to set, usually in the refrigerator. Sometimes these are lined with cupcake papers – round sheets of thin, rounded and fluted paper. The hydrogenated oil re-sets to give each cake its form without baking.

Variations include adding raisins, chocolate chips, mini-marshmallows, or peanut butter. Alternatives to Rice Bubbles include Corn Flakes and crispy fried noodles. Melted chocolate or non-hydrogenated coconut oil can be substituted for hydrogenated coconut oil.

== See also ==
- Honey Joys
- Rice Krispies Treats
- White Christmas (food)
