= Displacement (geometry) =

Vector relating the initial and the final positions of a moving point

- Displacement versus distance travelled along a path
- Common symbols: d, s, ∆s , ∆x , ∆y, ∆z
- SI unit: metre
- In SI base units: m
- Dimension: L

In geometry and mechanics, a displacement is a vector whose length is the shortest distance from the initial to the final position of a point P undergoing motion. It quantifies both the distance and direction of the net or total motion along a straight line from the initial position to the final position of the point trajectory. A displacement may be identified with the translation that maps the initial position to the final position. Displacement is the shift in location when an object in motion changes from one position to another. For motion over a given interval of time, the displacement divided by the length of the time interval defines the average velocity (a vector), whose magnitude is the average speed (a scalar quantity), over the motion on this time interval.

== Formulation ==
A displacement may be formulated as a relative position (resulting from the motion), that is, as the final position x_{f} of a point relative to its initial position x_{i}. The corresponding displacement vector can be defined as the difference between the final and initial positions:
$$s = x_\textrm{f} - x_\textrm{i} = \Delta{x}$$

== Rigid body ==
In dealing with the motion of a rigid body, the term displacement or motion (rigid body motion) may also include the rotations of the body. In this case, the displacement of a particle of the body is called linear displacement (displacement along a line), while the rotation of the body is called angular displacement.

== Derivatives ==
For a position vector $\mathbf{s}$ that is a function of time $t$, the derivatives can be computed with respect to $t$. The first two derivatives are frequently encountered in physics.

Velocity
$$\mathbf{v} = \frac{d\mathbf{s}}{dt}$$
Acceleration
$$\mathbf{a} = \frac{d\mathbf{v}}{dt} = \frac{d^2\mathbf{s}}{dt^2}$$
Jerk
$$\mathbf{j} = \frac{d\mathbf{a}}{dt} = \frac{d^2\mathbf{v}}{dt^2}=\frac{d^3\mathbf{s}}{dt^3}$$

These common names correspond to terminology used in basic kinematics. By extension, the higher order derivatives can be computed in a similar fashion. Study of these higher order derivatives can improve approximations of the original displacement function. Such higher-order terms are required in order to accurately represent the displacement function as a sum of an infinite series, enabling several analytical techniques in engineering and physics. The fourth order derivative is called jounce.

== Discussion ==
In considering motions of objects over time, the instantaneous velocity of the object is the rate of change of the displacement as a function of time. The instantaneous speed, then, is distinct from velocity, or the time rate of change of the distance travelled along a specific path. The velocity may be equivalently defined as the time rate of change of the position vector. If one considers a moving initial position, or equivalently a moving origin (e.g. an initial position or origin which is fixed to a train wagon, which in turn moves on its rail track), the velocity of P (e.g. a point representing the position of a passenger walking on the train) may be referred to as a relative velocity; this is opposed to an absolute velocity, which is computed with respect to a point and coordinate axes which are considered to be at rest (a inertial frame of reference such as, for instance, a point fixed on the floor of the train station and the usual vertical and horizontal directions).

== See also ==
- Affine space
- Deformation (mechanics)
- Displacement field (mechanics)
- Equipollence (geometry)
- Motion vector
- Position vector
- Radial velocity
- Screw displacement

Linear/translational quantities				Angular/rotational quantities			
Dimensions	1	L	L^{2}	Dimensions	1	θ	θ^{2}
T	time: t s	absement: A m s		T	time: t s		
1		distance: d, position: r, s, x, displacement: d m	area: A m^{2}	1		angle: θ, angular displacement: θ rad	solid angle: Ω rad^{2}, sr
T^{−1}	frequency: f s^{−1}, Hz	speed: v, velocity: v m s^{−1}	kinematic viscosity: ν, specific angular momentum: h m^{2} s^{−1}	T^{−1}	frequency: f, rotational speed: n, rotational velocity: n s^{−1}, Hz	angular speed: ω, angular velocity: ω rad s^{−1}	
T^{−2}		acceleration: a m s^{−2}		T^{−2}	rotational acceleration s^{−2}	angular acceleration: α rad s^{−2}	
T^{−3}		jerk: j m s^{−3}		T^{−3}		angular jerk: ζ rad s^{−3}	
M	mass: m kg	weighted position: M ⟨x⟩ = ∑ m x	moment of inertia: I kg m^{2}	ML			
MT^{−1}	Mass flow rate: $\dot{m}$ kg s^{−1}	momentum: p, impulse: J kg m s^{−1}, N s	action: 𝒮, actergy: ℵ kg m^{2} s^{−1}, J s	MLT^{−1}		angular momentum: L, angular impulse: ΔL kg m rad s^{−1}	
MT^{−2}		force: F, weight: F_{g} kg m s^{−2}, N	energy: E, work: W, Lagrangian: L kg m^{2} s^{−2}, J	MLT^{−2}		torque: τ, moment: M kg m rad s^{−2}, N m	
MT^{−3}		yank: Y kg m s^{−3}, N s^{−1}	power: P kg m^{2} s^{−3}, W	MLT^{−3}		rotatum: P kg m rad s^{−3}, N m s^{−1}	
