= Position (geometry) =

Vector representing the position of a point with respect to a fixed origin

Radius vector $\vec{r}$ represents the position of a point $\mathrm{P}(x,y,z)$ with respect to origin O. In Cartesian coordinate system $\vec{r}=x\,\hat{e}_x+y\,\hat{e}_y+z\,\hat{e}_z.$

In geometry, a position or position vector, also known as location vector or radius vector, is a Euclidean vector that represents a point P in space. Its length represents the distance in relation to an arbitrary reference origin O, and its direction represents the angular orientation with respect to given reference axes. Usually denoted x, r, or s, it corresponds to the straight line segment from O to P. In other words, it is the displacement or translation that maps the origin to P:

$$\mathbf{r}=\overrightarrow{OP}.$$

The term position vector is used mostly in the fields of differential geometry, mechanics and occasionally vector calculus. Frequently this is used in two-dimensional or three-dimensional space, but can be easily generalized to Euclidean spaces and affine spaces of any dimension.

== Relative position ==
The relative position of a point Q with respect to point P is the Euclidean vector resulting from the subtraction of the two absolute position vectors (each with respect to the origin):

$$\Delta \mathbf{r}=\mathbf{s} - \mathbf{r}=\overrightarrow{PQ},$$

where $\mathbf{s}=\overrightarrow{OQ}$. The direction between two points is their relative position normalized as a unit vector.

== Definition and representation ==
=== Three dimensions ===
Space curve in 3D. The position vector r is parameterized by a scalar t. At r = a the red line is the tangent to the curve, and the blue plane is normal to the curve.

In three dimensions, any set of three-dimensional coordinates and their corresponding basis vectors can be used to define the location of a point in space—whichever is the simplest for the task at hand may be used.

Commonly, one uses the familiar Cartesian coordinate system, or sometimes spherical polar coordinates, or cylindrical coordinates:

$$\begin{align}
\mathbf{r}(t)
& \equiv \mathbf{r}(x,y,z) \equiv x(t)\mathbf{\hat{e}}_x + y(t)\mathbf{\hat{e}}_y + z(t)\mathbf{\hat{e}}_z  \\
& \equiv \mathbf{r}(r,\theta,\phi) \equiv r(t)\mathbf{\hat{e}}_r\big(\theta(t), \phi(t)\big) \\
& \equiv \mathbf{r}(r,\phi,z) \equiv r(t)\mathbf{\hat{e}}_r\big(\phi(t)\big) + z(t)\mathbf{\hat{e}}_z, \\
\end{align}$$

where t is a parameter, owing to their rectangular or circular symmetry. These different coordinates and corresponding basis vectors represent the same position vector. More general curvilinear coordinates could be used instead and are in contexts like continuum mechanics and general relativity (in the latter case one needs an additional time coordinate).

=== n dimensions ===
Linear algebra allows for the abstraction of an n-dimensional position vector. A position vector can be expressed as a linear combination of basis vectors:

$$\mathbf{r} = \sum_{i=1}^n x_i \mathbf{e}_i = x_1 \mathbf{e}_1 + x_2 \mathbf{e}_2 + \dotsb + x_n \mathbf{e}_n.$$

The set of all position vectors forms position space (a vector space whose elements are the position vectors), since positions can be added (vector addition) and scaled in length (scalar multiplication) to obtain another position vector in the space. The notion of "space" is intuitive, since each x_{i} (i = 1, 2, …, n) can have any value, the collection of values defines a point in space.

The dimension of the position space is n (also denoted dim(R) = n). The coordinates of the vector r with respect to the basis vectors e_{i} are x_{i}. The vector of coordinates forms the coordinate vector or n-tuple (x_{1}, x_{2}, …, x_{n}).

Each coordinate x_{i} may be parameterized a number of parameters t. One parameter x_{i}(t) would describe a curved 1D path, two parameters x_{i}(t_{1}, t_{2}) describes a curved 2D surface, three x_{i}(t_{1}, t_{2}, t_{3}) describes a curved 3D volume of space, and so on.

The linear span of a basis set B = {e_{1}, e_{2}, …, e_{n}} equals the position space R, denoted span(B) = R.

== Applications ==
=== Differential geometry ===
Position vector fields are used to describe continuous and differentiable space curves, in which case the independent parameter needs not be time, but can be (e.g.) arc length of the curve.

=== Mechanics ===
In any equation of motion, the position vector r(t) is usually the most sought-after quantity because this function defines the motion of a particle (i.e. a point mass) – its location relative to a given coordinate system at some time t.

To define motion in terms of position, each coordinate may be parametrized by time; since each successive value of time corresponds to a sequence of successive spatial locations given by the coordinates, the continuum limit of many successive locations is a path the particle traces.

In the case of one dimension, the position has only one component, so it effectively degenerates to a scalar coordinate. It could be, say, a vector in the x direction, or the radial r direction. Equivalent notations include

$$\mathbf{x} \equiv x \equiv x(t), \quad r \equiv r(t), \quad s \equiv s(t).$$

== Derivatives ==
Kinematic quantities of a classical particle: mass m, position r, velocity v, acceleration a

For a position vector r that is a function of time t, the time derivatives can be computed with respect to t. These derivatives have common utility in the study of kinematics, control theory, engineering and other sciences.

Velocity
$$\mathbf{v} = \frac{\mathrm{d}\mathbf{r}}{\mathrm{d}t},$$
where dr is an infinitesimally small displacement (vector).
Acceleration
$$\mathbf{a} = \frac{\mathrm{d}\mathbf{v}}{\mathrm{d}t} = \frac{\mathrm{d}^2\mathbf{r}}{\mathrm{d}t^2}.$$
Jerk
$$\mathbf{j} = \frac{\mathrm{d}\mathbf{a}}{\mathrm{d}t} = \frac{\mathrm{d}^2\mathbf{v}}{\mathrm{d}t^2} = \frac{\mathrm{d}^3\mathbf{r}}{\mathrm{d}t^3}.$$

These names for the first, second and third derivative of position are commonly used in basic kinematics. By extension, the higher-order derivatives can be computed in a similar fashion. Study of these higher-order derivatives can improve approximations of the original displacement function. Such higher-order terms are required in order to accurately represent the displacement function as a sum of an infinite sequence, enabling several analytical techniques in engineering and physics.

== See also ==
- Affine space
- Coordinate system
- Horizontal position
- Line element
- Parametric surface
- Position fixing
- Position four-vector
- Six degrees of freedom
- Vertical position

== Notes ==
Linear/translational quantities				Angular/rotational quantities			
Dimensions	1	L	L^{2}	Dimensions	1	θ	θ^{2}
T	time: t s	absement: A m s		T	time: t s		
1		distance: d, position: r, s, x, displacement m	area: A m^{2}	1		angle: θ, angular displacement: θ rad	solid angle: Ω rad^{2}, sr
T^{−1}	frequency: f s^{−1}, Hz	speed: v, velocity: v m s^{−1}	kinematic viscosity: ν, specific angular momentum: h m^{2} s^{−1}	T^{−1}	frequency: f, rotational speed: n, rotational velocity: n s^{−1}, Hz	angular speed: ω, angular velocity: ω rad s^{−1}	
T^{−2}		acceleration: a m s^{−2}		T^{−2}	rotational acceleration s^{−2}	angular acceleration: α rad s^{−2}	
T^{−3}		jerk: j m s^{−3}		T^{−3}		angular jerk: ζ rad s^{−3}	
M	mass: m kg	weighted position: M ⟨x⟩ = ∑ m x	moment of inertia: I kg m^{2}	ML			
MT^{−1}	Mass flow rate: $\dot{m}$ kg s^{−1}	momentum: p, impulse: J kg m s^{−1}, N s	action: 𝒮, actergy: ℵ kg m^{2} s^{−1}, J s	MLT^{−1}		angular momentum: L, angular impulse: ΔL kg m rad s^{−1}	
MT^{−2}		force: F, weight: F_{g} kg m s^{−2}, N	energy: E, work: W, Lagrangian: L kg m^{2} s^{−2}, J	MLT^{−2}		torque: τ, moment: M kg m rad s^{−2}, N m	
MT^{−3}		yank: Y kg m s^{−3}, N s^{−1}	power: P kg m^{2} s^{−3}, W	MLT^{−3}		rotatum: P kg m rad s^{−3}, N m s^{−1}	
