= White Christmas (food) =

Australian dessert

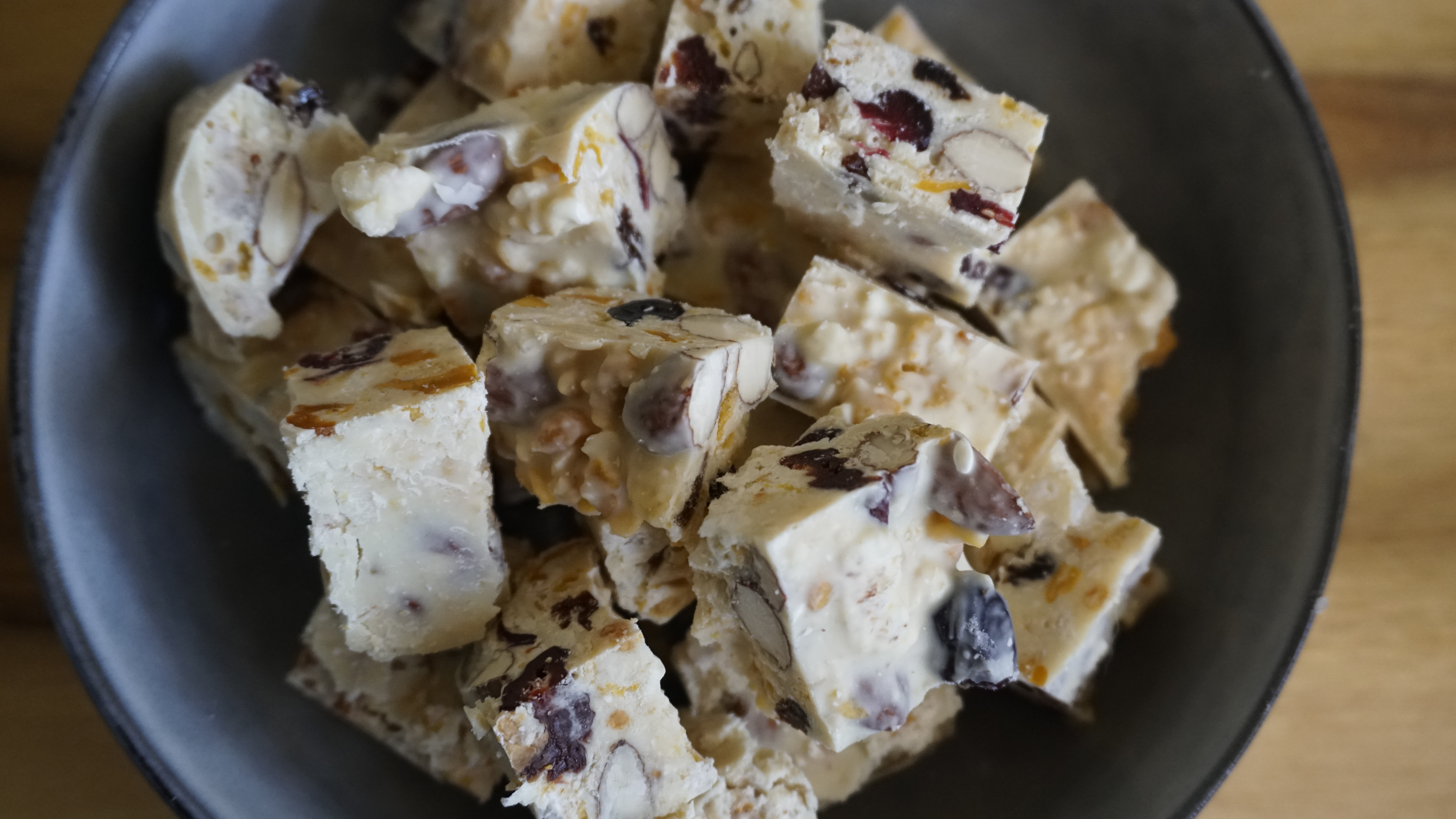
- Course: Dessert
- Place of origin: Australia
- Main ingredients: Raisins, glacé cherries, desiccated coconut, icing sugar, milk powder and rice bubbles

White Christmas is an Australian dessert made from dried fruit such as sultanas, glacé cherries, desiccated coconut, icing sugar, milk powder and Rice Bubbles, with hydrogenated coconut oil (such as the brand Copha) as the binding ingredient.

The hydrogenated oil is melted and combined with the dry ingredients. The mixture is poured into a rectangular baking tin and left to set, usually in the refrigerator. Once set, it is cut into squares for eating.

It is a popular Christmas food item, especially as it can easily be made by children.

== See also ==
- Australian cuisine
- Chocolate crackles, a sweet similarly using Rice Bubbles and hydrogenated oil.
