= Rice Krispies =

Breakfast cereal made by WK Kellogg Co and Kellanova

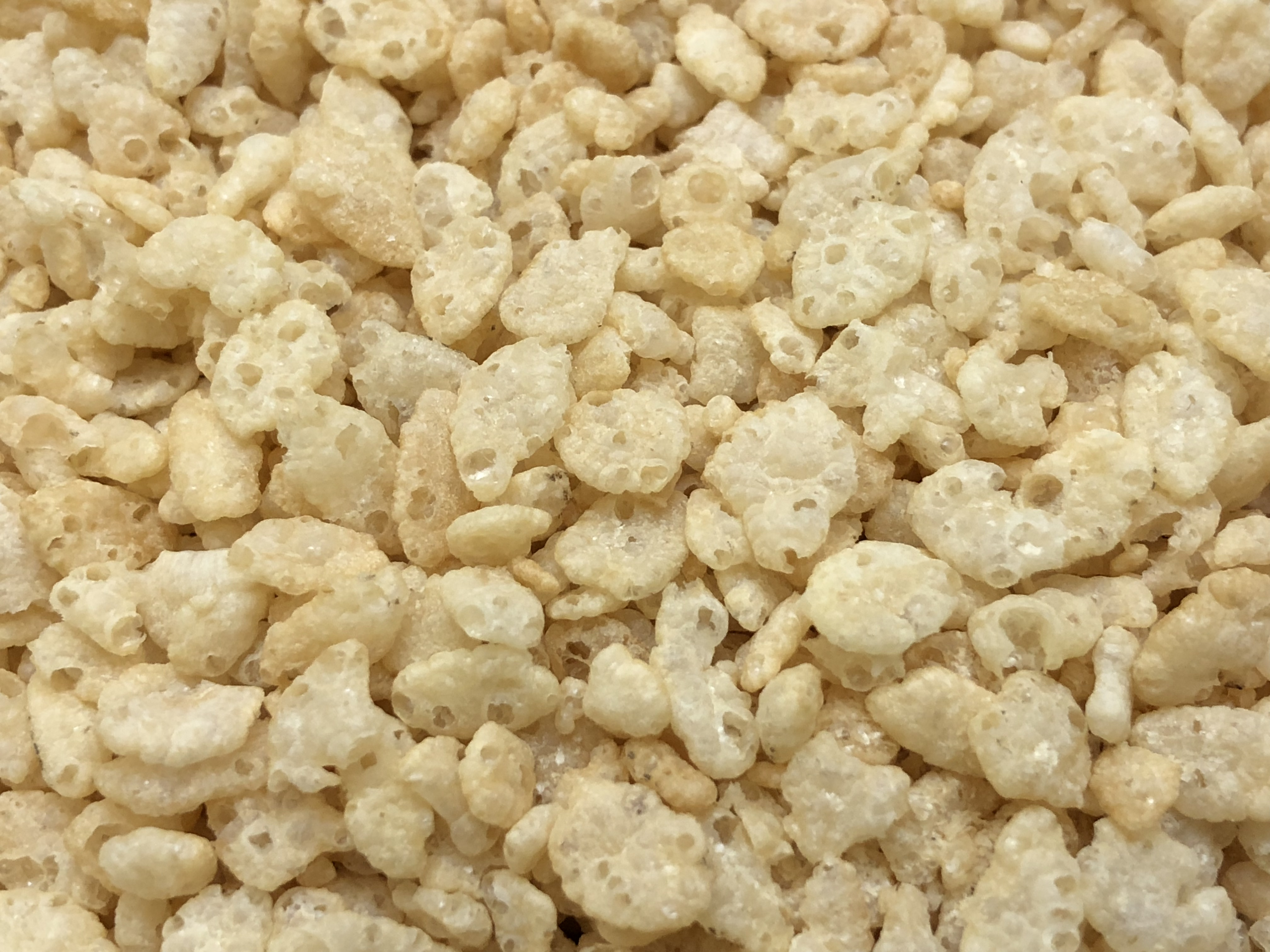
- Product type: Cereal of crisped rice
- Current owner: WK Kellogg Co (US, Canada, Caribbean); Kellanova (rest of world)
- Country: United States
- Introduced: 1928; 98 years ago
- Markets: Worldwide
- Previous owners: Kellogg Company (1927–2023)
- Website: ricekrispies.com

Rice Krispies (known as Rice Bubbles in Australia and New Zealand) is a breakfast cereal produced by WK Kellogg Co for the United States, Canada and the Caribbean and by Kellanova for the rest of the world. (Note: WK Kellogg consists only of the North American cereal business of the former Kellogg Company (now Kellanova), which also covers the Caribbean. Both companies continue to use the Kellogg's brand name.) Rice Krispies are made of crisped rice. When milk is added to the cereal the rice tends to collapse, creating the characteristic "snap, crackle and pop" sounds.

Rice Krispies cereal has a long advertising history with the elf cartoon characters Snap, Crackle and Pop touting the brand.

== Background ==
Rice Krispies was released to the public by the Kellogg Company in 1928.

The original patent called for using partially dried grain, which could be whole or broken, that would have 15–30% moisture which could then be shaped by existing processes for cereal production that include rolling, flaking, shredding, etc. After being processed to the desired shape the grain is dried to around 5–14% moisture content at which stage the grain will expand when subjected to a high temperature creating a light, low-density product that is crisp and easy to chew.

The “Snap, Crackle, Pop” slogan was in use as early as 1929, with “New! A cereal so crisp it actually crackles in cream!” In 1939 the cereal was advertised as staying "crackly crisp in milk or cream...not mushy!" with claims that the cereal would remain floating (without sinking to the bottom of the bowl) even after 2 hours in milk. They were not a shredded or flaked cereal type, but were instead created by a patented process that Kellogg's called "oven-popping".

Following the 2023 spinoff of the North American cereal division of the original Kellogg Company, Rice Krispies are made by WK Kellogg Co for the United States, Canadian, and Caribbean markets and by Kellanova (the former Kellogg Company) for the rest of the world.

== Ingredients ==
Rice Krispies contain rice, sugar, salt, malt flavoring, iron, ascorbic acid (vitamin C), alpha tocopherol acetate (vitamin E), niacinamide, vitamin A palmitate, pyridoxine hydrochloride (vitamin B6), riboflavin (vitamin B2), thiamin hydrochloride (vitamin B1), folic acid, vitamin B12 (as cyanocobalamin) and vitamin D.

According to Kellogg's, the rice used in the US version of the cereal is grown in the states of Louisiana and Arkansas.

In 2026, the rice in the European version was replaced with rice flour due to changing weather conditions.

=== Health claims ===
In 2010 the Kellogg Company was found by the Federal Trade Commission to be making unsubstantiated and misleading health claims in advertising on Rice Krispies boxes. Claims made by the company included "now helps support your child's immunity" and "has been improved to include antioxidants and nutrients that your family needs to help them stay healthy." The FTC had previously found fault with Kellogg's claims that Frosted Mini-Wheats cereal improved children's attentiveness by nearly 20%.

== Variants ==
=== Present day ===
The names of other products within the Rice Krispies family vary depending on where they are sold:

- Cocoa Krispies (called Coco Pops in the UK, Ireland, South Africa, Australia, New Zealand, Greece and Italy), a chocolate flavored version (sold worldwide)
- Rice Krispies with Vanilla Flavor, sold in Canada and South Africa
- Rice Krispies Treats Cereal, contains bunches of krispies fused together by a marshmallow coating (introduced in March 1993)
- Kellogg's Strawberry Krispies
- Kellogg's Rainbow Krispies

Many generic versions of Rice Krispies (including frosted and chocolate variants) have been produced by other manufacturers under many different names.

=== Discontinued ===
- Frosted Rice Krispies (called Ricicles in the UK and Ireland)
- Rice Krispies with dehydrated miniature marshmallows (Marshmallow Rice Krispies, also known as Marshmallow Krispies, along with a tropical version, Fruity Marshmallow Krispies), were sold briefly in the United States and Canada. Despite surviving longer in Canada than the United States, they were discontinued during the late 1990s.
- Rice Krispies with strawberry flavor included 1983's Strawberry Krispies and 1997's Strawberry Rice Krispies. Australia had Strawberry Pops, a strawberry version of Rice Bubbles, which was discontinued in the mid-1970s, along with other similarly coloured and sweetened foods, due to concerns about the additives causing cancer. Banana-flavored Rice Krispies, including Banana Bubbles and Banana Krispies, have also been sold in the past.
- Razzle Dazzle Rice Krispies, an extremely sweet, artificially-colored cereal, was sold from late 1997 to 1999.
- Apple Cinnamon Rice Krispies, a cereal flavored with apple and cinnamon, was sold in the early 1990s.
- Rice Krispies with berry flavors, including Berry Krispies and Berry Rice Krispies.
- Rice Krispies with honey, Honey Rice Krispies, was sold in the UK and Canada for a short period of time in the late 1990s.

In the late 1990s, Kellogg's sold Halloween versions of their regular cereal. This included Halloween Rice Krispies which featured a variety of orange krispies.

=== Rice Krispies Treats and similar sweets ===
In 1939, Kellogg's employee Mildred Day concocted and published a recipe for a Camp Fire Girls bake sale consisting of Rice Krispies, melted marshmallows, and margarine. It has remained a very popular snack dubbed Rice Krispies Treats. Kellogg's themselves have now produced commercial varieties of both marshmallow and chocolate-based treats under the name Rice Krispies Squares in Canada and the UK, as well as versions under the original Rice Krispies Treats name sold in the United States.

Kellogg's also produces commercial versions of Rice Krispie treats known as Rice Krispies Squares, cereal bars, and a multi-grain cereal known as Rice Krispies Multi-Grain (formerly Muddles) sold on the UK market. Primarily aimed at children, Multi-Grain contains a prebiotic and is claimed by Kellogg's to promote good digestive health.

In Australia, Rice Bubbles are found in a well-known homemade sweet, the chocolate crackle. This is often found at fetes and consists of Rice Bubbles, copha and cocoa, amongst other things. In the UK, a similar treat is made of Rice Krispies and melted chocolate. White Christmas is another Australian sweet made with Rice Bubbles, milk powder, copha and dried fruit.

=== South Africa ===
In 2018, the South African branch of Kellogg's replaced the classic Rice Krispies with Rice Krispies Vanilla, thereby discontinuing the production of the original Rice Krispies in the country. This change was met with a lot of public complaints. The new Rice Krispies Vanilla now contained 21.7 g sugar for every 100 g, up from only 9 g previously, and the taste was very poorly received. Despite the public's dislike of the new product, Kellogg's initially decided to continue replacing the original Rice Krispies with the new Rice Krispies Vanilla. In 2020, Kellogg's returned the original product to shelves, but decided to import it from the UK as they determined it could no longer be produced locally. Import-related costs made the product more expensive for South African consumers.

== Marketing history ==
=== Cartoon mascots ===
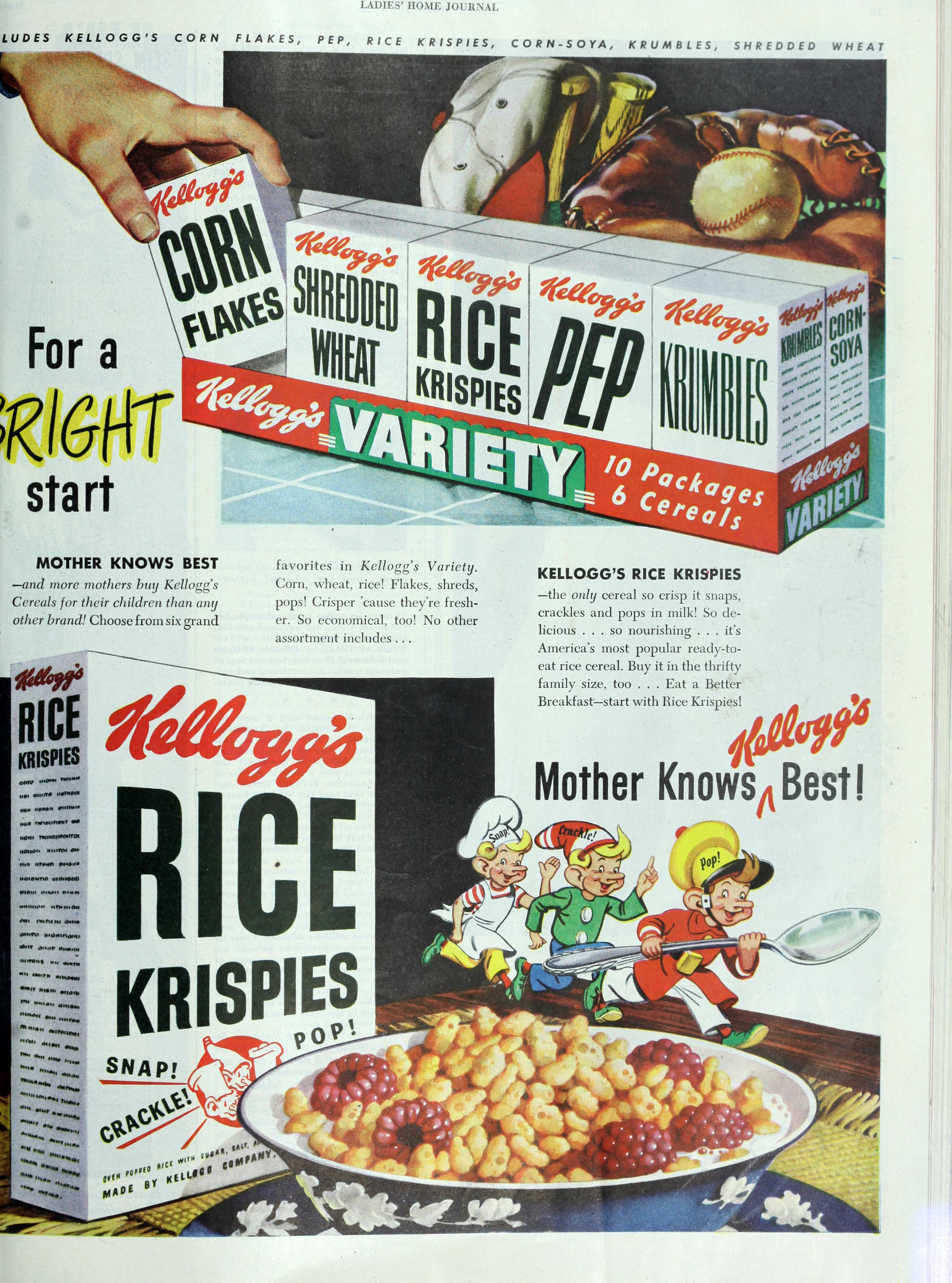
Rice Krispies displayed with other Kellogg's products in a 1948 ad

Snap, Crackle and Pop, the animated cartoon mascots for Rice Krispies, were created by illustrator Vernon Grant in 1933. The three characters are seen in Kellogg's 1933 national advertising and the three have since appeared together in many forms of advertising, including radio, movie shorts, and comic strips. An updated version of the elf-like Snap Crackle and Pop appeared for the first time on television in 1960; previously it was advertised by Woody Woodpecker. They are the first and longest-running cartoon characters to represent a Kellogg's product. In physics, Snap, Crackle and Pop inspired shorthand names for the fourth, fifth, and sixth derivatives of position.

=== "Snap, crackle and pop" sound ===
The cereal is marketed on the basis of the noises it produces when milk is added to the bowl. The onomatopoeic noises differ by country and language:

- English: Snap! Crackle! Pop!
- Danish: Pif! Paf! Puf!
- Swedish: Piff! Paff! Puff!
- German: Knisper! Knasper! Knusper!
- Spanish: Pim! Pam! Pum!
- Finnish: Riks! Raks! Poks!
- French: Cric! Crac! Croc!
- Dutch: Pif! Paf! Pof!
- Afrikaans: Knap! Knetter! Knak!
- Belgium: Poos! Pas! Pes!

=== Prizes and premiums ===
In 1938 and 1939, Vernon Grant, the illustrator who created Snap, Crackle and Pop, produced a set of six illustrations of Mother Goose themes including Humpty Dumpty, Jack and Jill, Jack Be Nimble, Little Jack Horner, Peter Peter Pumpkin Eater, and Twinkle Twinkle Little Star that were offered as premiums in exchange for two Rice Krispies boxtops and a three-cent stamp.

== See also ==
- List of breakfast cereals
