= Acceleration =

Rate of change of velocity

- In vacuum (no air resistance), objects attracted by Earth gain speed at a steady rate.
- Common symbols: a
- SI unit: m/s^{2}, m·s^{−2}, m s^{−2}
- Derivations from other quantities
- Dimension: $\mathsf{L} \mathsf{T}^{-2}$

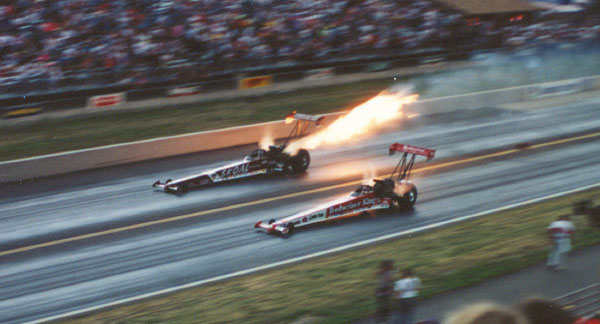
Drag racing is a sport in which specially-built vehicles compete to be the fastest to accelerate from a standing start.

In physics, acceleration is a measure of how fast and in what direction an object's speed and direction of motion are changing. It is defined as the rate of change of the velocity. Like velocity, acceleration has a magnitude and a direction, making it a vector quantity. The SI unit for acceleration is metre per second squared (m⋅s^{−2}, m/s^{2}).

The tangential acceleration of an object is the component of the acceleration which is in the same direction as the motion (or tangential velocity) of the object. When the velocity of the object does not change direction, this is called linear acceleration. Deceleration or retardation, on the other hand, is the component of the acceleration in the opposite (or antiparallel) direction to the tangential velocity. Radial acceleration or normal acceleration (or centripetal acceleration during circular motions) is the component of the acceleration that changes the direction of the object's velocity.

In Newtonian mechanics, the acceleration of a mass arises from forces acting on it, with its net acceleration being a result of the net force acting on it. By Newton's second law, the magnitude of the net acceleration will be proportional to the magnitude of the net force acting on the object and inversely proportional to the mass of the object, while the direction of the net acceleration will be the same as the direction of the net force.

== Definition and properties ==
Kinematic quantities of a classical particle: mass m, position r, velocity v, acceleration a.

=== Average acceleration ===
Acceleration is the rate of change of velocity. At any point on a trajectory, the magnitude of the acceleration is given by the rate of change of velocity in both magnitude and direction at that point. The true acceleration at time t is found in the limit as time interval Δt → 0 of Δv/Δt.

An object's average acceleration $\bar{\mathbf{a}}$ over a period of time is its change in velocity, $\Delta \mathbf{v}$, divided by the duration of the period, $\Delta t$. Mathematically,
$$\bar{\mathbf{a}} = \frac{\Delta \mathbf{v}}{\Delta t}.$$
The average acceleration is the simplest way to measure acceleration, requiring only knowledge of the change in velocity and the change in time. In a strict sense, the average acceleration is the only true acceleration one is able to directly measure without appealing to an empirical law, meaning that it is the most fundamental form of acceleration measurement.

The average acceleration is most often used to approximate the kinematics of an object by assuming that the velocity changes linearly with time. Over short time intervals, we can often assume that the acceleration is uniform, meaning acceleration $\mathbf a$ of the object will be exactly equal to the average acceleration $\bar\mathbf a$ (see subsection Uniform acceleration for details).

By Newton's second law of motion, the average acceleration is related to the average force $\bar\mathbf f$ on a particle of mass $m$ by,
$$\bar\mathbf f = m\bar\mathbf a.$$
This means that a measurement of the average acceleration is also a measurement of the average force (also known as impulse $\mathbf J = \bar\mathbf f$).

=== Instantaneous acceleration ===
From bottom to top: an acceleration function a(t); the integral of the acceleration is the velocity function v(t); and the integral of the velocity is the distance function s(t).

Instantaneous acceleration is the limit of the average acceleration over an infinitesimal interval of time. In the terms of calculus, instantaneous acceleration is the derivative of the velocity vector with respect to time:
$$\mathbf{a} = \lim_{{\Delta t} \to 0} \frac{\Delta \mathbf{v}}{\Delta t} = \frac{d\mathbf{v}}{dt} = \dot{\mathbf{v}}.$$
As acceleration is defined as the derivative of velocity, v, with respect to time t and velocity is defined as the derivative of position, x, with respect to time, acceleration can be thought of as the second derivative of x with respect to t:
$$\mathbf{a} = \frac{d\mathbf{v}}{dt} = \frac{d^2\mathbf{x}}{dt^2} = \ddot{\mathbf{x}}.$$
(Here and elsewhere, if motion is in a straight line, vector quantities can be substituted by scalars in the equations.)

By the fundamental theorem of calculus, it can be seen that the integral of the acceleration function a(t) is the velocity function v(t); that is, the area under the curve of an acceleration vs. time (a vs. t) graph corresponds to the change of velocity.

Likewise, the integral of the jerk function j(t), the derivative of the acceleration function, can be used to find the change of acceleration at a certain time:
$$\Delta \mathbf{a} =  \int \mathbf{j} \, dt.$$

=== Units ===
Acceleration has the dimensions of velocity (L/T) divided by time, i.e. L T^{−2}. The SI unit of acceleration is the metre per second squared (m s^{−2}); or "metre per second per second", as the velocity in metres per second changes by the acceleration value, every second.

=== Other forms ===
An object moving in a circular motion—such as a satellite orbiting the Earth—is accelerating due to the change of direction of motion, although its speed may be constant. In this case it is said to be undergoing centripetal (directed towards the center) acceleration.

Apple suspended in an upward-moving elevator: it moves downward during initial acceleration and upward during deceleration (stopping).

Proper acceleration, the acceleration of a body relative to a free-fall condition, is measured by an instrument called an accelerometer. Newton's second law is normally applied in an inertial reference frame. In a reference frame accelerating with acceleration $a$ (in one dimension), Newton's laws can still be used by introducing an inertial force (fictitious force) $F = -ma$ on a mass $m$, opposite the acceleration of the frame. This accounts for the tendency of the mass to maintain its inertial motion—to stay "as is," at rest or moving at constant velocity—while the frame accelerates. One example is that a person in an elevator feels heavier or lighter as the elevator accelerates or decelerates. If $m$ is known, measurement of the supporting force on the mass can be used to infer the acceleration; this is the principle of a mechanical accelerometer. In general relativity, gravity and inertial acceleration may be locally indistinguishable (see General relativity).

In classical mechanics, for a body with constant mass, the (vector) acceleration of the body's center of mass is proportional to the net force vector (i.e. sum of all forces) acting on it (Newton's second law): where F is the net force acting on the body, m is the mass of the body, and a is the center-of-mass acceleration. As speeds approach the speed of light, relativistic effects become increasingly large.

== Example ==
When a vehicle starts from a standstill (zero velocity, in an inertial frame of reference) and travels in a straight line at increasing speeds, it is accelerating in the direction of travel. If the vehicle turns, an acceleration occurs toward the new direction and changes its motion vector. The component of acceleration of the vehicle in the direction of its velocity is called a linear acceleration or tangential acceleration, its effect being the passengers on board experience as a fictitious force pushing them back into or away from their seats. When changing direction, the component of the acceleration perpendicular to the velocity is called radial or normal acceleration (or centripetal acceleration during circular motion), the reaction to which the passengers experience as a centrifugal force (another fictitious force). If the speed of the vehicle decreases, this is an acceleration in the opposite direction of the velocity vector, sometimes called deceleration or retardation, and passengers experience the reaction to deceleration as an inertial force pushing them forward. Such deceleration is often achieved by retrorocket burning in spacecraft. Both acceleration and deceleration are treated the same, as they are both changes in velocity. Each of these accelerations (tangential, radial, deceleration) is felt by passengers until their relative (differential) velocity is neutralised in reference to the acceleration due to change in speed.

== Tangential and centripetal acceleration ==
An oscillating pendulum, with velocity and acceleration marked. It experiences both tangential and centripetal acceleration.

Components of acceleration for a curved motion. The tangential component a_{t} is due to the change in speed of traversal, and points along the curve in the direction of the velocity vector (or in the opposite direction). The normal component (also called centripetal component for circular motion) a_{c} is due to the change in direction of the velocity vector and is normal to the trajectory, pointing toward the center of curvature of the path.

The velocity of a particle moving on a curved path as a function of time can be written as:
$$\mathbf{v} = v \frac{\mathbf{v}}{v} = v \mathbf{u}_\mathrm{t} ,$$
with v equal to the speed of travel along the path, and
$$\mathbf{u}_\mathrm{t} = \frac{\mathbf{v}}{v} \, ,$$
a unit vector tangent to the path pointing in the direction of motion at the chosen moment in time. Taking into account both the changing speed v and the changing direction of u_{t}, the acceleration of a particle moving on a curved path can be written using the chain rule of differentiation for the product of two functions of time as:

$$\begin{alignat}{3}
\mathbf{a} & = \frac{d \mathbf{v}}{dt} \\
& =  \frac{dv}{dt} \mathbf{u}_\mathrm{t} +v\frac{d \mathbf{u}_\mathrm{t}}{dt} \\
& = \frac{dv }{dt} \mathbf{u}_\mathrm{t} + \frac{v^2}{r}\mathbf{u}_\mathrm{n}\ ,
\end{alignat}$$

where u_{n} is the unit (inward) normal vector to the particle's trajectory (also called the principal normal), and r is its instantaneous radius of curvature based upon the osculating circle at time t. The components
$$\mathbf{a}_\mathrm{t} = \frac{dv }{dt} \mathbf{u}_\mathrm{t} \quad\text{and}\quad \mathbf{a}_\mathrm{c} = \frac{v^2}{r}\mathbf{u}_\mathrm{n}$$
are called the tangential acceleration and the normal or radial acceleration (or centripetal acceleration in circular motion, see also circular motion and centripetal force), respectively.

Geometrical analysis of three-dimensional space curves, which explains tangent, (principal) normal and binormal, is described by the Frenet–Serret formulas.

== Special cases ==
=== Uniform acceleration ===
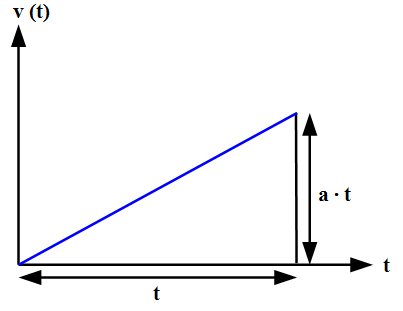
Calculation of the speed difference for a uniform acceleration

Uniform or constant acceleration is a type of motion in which the velocity of an object changes by an equal amount in every equal time period.

A frequently cited example of uniform acceleration is that of an object in free fall in a uniform gravitational field. The acceleration of a falling body in the absence of resistances to motion is dependent only on the gravitational field strength g (also called acceleration due to gravity). By Newton's second law the force $\mathbf{F_g}$ acting on a body is given by:
$$\mathbf{F_g} = m  \mathbf{g}.$$

Because of the simple analytic properties of the case of constant acceleration, there are simple formulas relating the displacement, initial and time-dependent velocities, and acceleration to the time elapsed:
$$\begin{align}
\mathbf{x}(t) &= \mathbf{x}_0 + \mathbf{v}_0 t + \tfrac{1}{2} \mathbf{a}t^2
&= \mathbf{x}_0 + \tfrac{1}{2} \left(\mathbf{v}_0 + \mathbf{v}(t)\right) t \\
\mathbf{v}(t) &= \mathbf{v}_0 + \mathbf{a} t \\
{v^2}(t) &= {v_0}^2 + 2\mathbf{a \cdot}[\mathbf{x}(t)-\mathbf{x}_0],
\end{align}$$
where

- $t$ is the elapsed time,
- $\mathbf{x}_0$ is the initial displacement from the origin,
- $\mathbf{x}(t)$ is the displacement from the origin at time $t$,
- $\mathbf{v}_0$ is the initial velocity,
- $\mathbf{v}(t)$ is the velocity at time $t$, and
- $\mathbf{a}$ is the uniform rate of acceleration.

In particular, the motion can be resolved into two orthogonal parts, one of constant velocity and the other according to the above equations. As Galileo showed, the net result is parabolic motion, which describes, e.g., the trajectory of a projectile in vacuum near the surface of Earth.

=== Circular motion ===
Position vector r, always points radially from the origin.

Velocity vector v, always tangent to the path of motion.

Acceleration vector a, not parallel to the radial motion but offset by the angular and Coriolis accelerations, nor tangent to the path but offset by the centripetal and radial accelerations.

Kinematic vectors in plane polar coordinates. Notice the setup is not restricted to 2d space, but may represent the osculating plane plane in a point of an arbitrary curve in any higher dimension.

In uniform circular motion, that is moving with constant speed along a circular path, a particle experiences an acceleration resulting from the change of the direction of the velocity vector, while its magnitude remains constant. The derivative of the location of a point on a curve with respect to time, i.e. its velocity, turns out to be always exactly tangential to the curve, respectively orthogonal to the radius in this point. Since in uniform motion the velocity in the tangential direction does not change, the acceleration must be in radial direction, pointing to the center of the circle. This acceleration constantly changes the direction of the velocity to be tangent in the neighbouring point, thereby rotating the velocity vector along the circle.

- For a given speed $v$, the magnitude of this geometrically caused acceleration (centripetal acceleration) is inversely proportional to the radius $r$ of the circle, and increases as the square of this speed:
- For a given angular velocity $\omega$, the centripetal acceleration is directly proportional to radius $r$. This is due to the dependence of velocity $v$ on the radius $r$.
  $$v = \omega r.$$

Expressing centripetal acceleration vector in polar components, where $\mathbf{r}$ is a vector from the centre of the circle to the particle with magnitude equal to this distance, and considering the orientation of the acceleration towards the center, yields
$$\mathbf {a}_c = -\frac{v^2}{|\mathbf {r}|}\cdot \frac{\mathbf {r}}{|\mathbf {r}|}\,.$$
As usual in rotations, the speed $v$ of a particle may be expressed as an angular speed with respect to a point at the distance $r$ as Thus $\mathbf {a}_c = -\omega^2 \mathbf {r}\,.$

This acceleration and the mass of the particle determine the necessary centripetal force, directed toward the centre of the circle, as the net force acting on this particle to keep it in this uniform circular motion. The so-called 'centrifugal force', appearing to act outward on the body, is a so-called pseudo force experienced in the frame of reference of the body in circular motion, due to the body's linear momentum, a vector tangent to the circle of motion.

In a nonuniform circular motion, i.e., the speed along the curved path is changing, the acceleration has a non-zero component tangential to the curve, and is not confined to the principal normal, which directs to the center of the osculating circle, that determines the radius $r$ for the centripetal acceleration. The tangential component is given by the angular acceleration $\alpha$, i.e., the rate of change $\alpha = \dot\omega$ of the angular speed $\omega$ times the radius $r$. That is,
$$a_t = r \alpha.$$

The sign of the tangential component of the acceleration is determined by the sign of the angular acceleration ($\alpha$), and the tangent is always directed at right angles to the radius vector.

== Coordinate systems ==
In multi-dimensional Cartesian coordinate systems, acceleration is broken up into components that correspond with each dimensional axis of the coordinate system. In a two-dimensional system, where there is an x-axis and a y-axis, corresponding acceleration components are defined as
$$\begin{align}
a_x &= \frac{dv_x}{dt} = \frac{d^2x}{dt^2}, \\
a_y &= \frac{dv_y}{dt} = \frac{d^2y}{dt^2}.
\end{align}$$
The two-dimensional acceleration vector is then defined as $\mathbf{a} = \langle a_x, a_y\rangle$. The magnitude of this vector is found by the distance formula as
$$|a| = \sqrt{a_x^2 + a_y^2}.$$
In three-dimensional systems where there is an additional z-axis, the corresponding acceleration component is defined as
$$a_z = \frac{dv_z}{dt} = \frac{d^2z}{dt^2}.$$
The three-dimensional acceleration vector is defined as $\mathbf{a} = \langle a_x, a_y, a_z\rangle$ with its magnitude being determined by
$$|a| = \sqrt{a_x^2 + a_y^2 + a_z^2}.$$

== Relation to relativity ==
=== Special relativity ===
The special theory of relativity describes the behaviour of objects travelling relative to other objects at speeds approaching that of light in vacuum. Newtonian mechanics is exactly revealed to be an approximation to reality, valid to great accuracy at lower speeds. As the relevant speeds increase toward the speed of light, acceleration no longer follows classical equations.

As speeds approach that of light, the acceleration produced by a given force decreases, becoming infinitesimally small as light speed is approached; an object with mass can approach this speed asymptotically, but never reach it.

=== General relativity ===
Unless the state of motion of an object is known, it is impossible to distinguish whether an observed force is due to gravity or to acceleration—gravity and inertial acceleration have identical effects. Albert Einstein called this the equivalence principle, and said that only observers who feel no force at all—including the force of gravity—are justified in concluding that they are not accelerating.

== Conversions ==
Conversions between common units of acceleration
Base value	(Gal, or cm/s^{2})	(ft/s^{2})	(m/s^{2})	(standard gravity, g_{0})
1 Gal, or cm/s^{2}	1	0.0328084	0.01	1.01972×10^{−3}
1 ft/s^{2}	30.4800	1	0.304800	0.0310810
1 m/s^{2}	100	1/0.3048 ≈ 3.28084	1	0.101972
1 g_{0}	980.665	32.1740	9.80665	1

== See also ==
- Acceleration (differential geometry)
- Four-vector: making the connection between space and time explicit
- Gravitational acceleration
- Inertia
- Orders of magnitude (acceleration)
- Shock (mechanics)
- Shock and vibration data logger measuring 3-axis acceleration
- Space travel using constant acceleration
- Specific force

Linear/translational quantities				Angular/rotational quantities			
Dimensions	1	L	L^{2}	Dimensions	1	θ	θ^{2}
T	time: t s	absement: A m s		T	time: t s		
1		distance: d, position: r, s, x, displacement: d m	area: A m^{2}	1		angle: θ, angular displacement: θ rad	solid angle: Ω rad^{2}, sr
T^{−1}	frequency: f s^{−1}, Hz	speed: v, velocity: v m s^{−1}	kinematic viscosity: ν, specific angular momentum: h m^{2} s^{−1}	T^{−1}	frequency: f, rotational speed: n, rotational velocity: n s^{−1}, Hz	angular speed: ω, angular velocity: ω rad s^{−1}	
T^{−2}		acceleration: a m s^{−2}		T^{−2}	rotational acceleration s^{−2}	angular acceleration: α rad s^{−2}	
T^{−3}		jerk: j m s^{−3}		T^{−3}		angular jerk: ζ rad s^{−3}	
M	mass: m kg	weighted position: M ⟨x⟩ = ∑ m x	moment of inertia: I kg m^{2}	ML			
MT^{−1}	Mass flow rate: $\dot{m}$ kg s^{−1}	momentum: p, impulse: J kg m s^{−1}, N s	action: 𝒮, actergy: ℵ kg m^{2} s^{−1}, J s	MLT^{−1}		angular momentum: L, angular impulse: ΔL kg m rad s^{−1}	
MT^{−2}		force: F, weight: F_{g} kg m s^{−2}, N	energy: E, work: W, Lagrangian: L kg m^{2} s^{−2}, J	MLT^{−2}		torque: τ, moment: M kg m rad s^{−2}, N m	
MT^{−3}		yank: Y kg m s^{−3}, N s^{−1}	power: P kg m^{2} s^{−3}, W	MLT^{−3}		rotatum: P kg m rad s^{−3}, N m s^{−1}	
