= Index of physics articles (L) =

The index of physics articles is split into multiple pages due to its size.

To navigate by individual letter use the table of contents below.

== L ==
- L band
- L. Gary Leal
- L. M. Milne-Thomson
- L3 (CERN)
- Laboratori Nazionali del Gran Sasso
- Laboratório Nacional de Luz Síncrotron
- Laboratory for Laser Energetics
- Laboratory frame of reference
- Laboratory oven
- Laboratory techniques
- Ladder operator
- Ladder paradox
- Ladislas Goldstein
- LAGEOS
- Lagrangian (field theory)
- Lagrangian analysis
- Lagrangian and Eulerian specification of the flow field
- Lagrangian coherent structures
- Lagrangian particle tracking
- Lagrangian point
- Lamb–Mössbauer factor
- Lamb–Oseen vortex
- Lamb shift
- Lamb waves
- Lambda-CDM model
- Lambda baryon
- Lambda point refrigerator
- Lambda point
- Lambda transition
- Lambdavacuum solution
- Lambert's cosine law
- Lambert's problem
- Lambert (unit)
- Lambert radiator
- Lambertian reflectance
- Lamé parameters
- Lamellar vector field
- Laminar–turbulent transition
- Laminar flow
- Laminar sublayer
- Lamm equation
- LAMMPS
- Lancelot Law Whyte
- Lanczos tensor
- Land speed
- Landau–Hopf theory of turbulence
- Landau–Lifshitz–Gilbert equation
- Landau–Zener formula
- Landau damping
- Landau Institute for Theoretical Physics
- Landau pole
- Landau quantization
- Landau theory
- Landauer's principle
- Landauer formula
- Landé g-factor
- Landé interval rule
- Landolt–Börnstein
- Landspout
- Lane–Emden equation
- Langevin dynamics
- Langevin equation
- Langevin function
- Langmuir–Blodgett film
- Langmuir circulation
- Langmuir probe
- Langmuir waves
- Langworthy Professor
- Laplace–Runge–Lenz vector
- Laplace formula
- Laplace number
- Laplace pressure
- Laplace series
- Lapse rate
- LARES (satellite)
- Large Apparatus studying Grand Unification and Neutrino Astrophysics
- Large Area Neutron Detector
- Large diffeomorphism
- Large eddy simulation
- Large Electron–Positron Collider
- Large electrostatic generator (Teylers)
- Large extra dimension
- Large gauge transformation
- Large Hadron Collider
- Large Helical Device
- Large Plasma Device
- Large Underground Xenon experiment
- Large Volume Detector
- LArIAT
- Larkin Kerwin
- Larmor formula
- Larmor precession
- Larry Smarr
- Lars Onsager Prize
- Lars Onsager
- Larson–Miller relation
- Laser-heated pedestal growth
- Laser-induced fluorescence
- Laser-induced incandescence
- Laser ablation synthesis in solution
- Laser ablation
- Laser acronyms
- Laser construction
- Laser cooling
- Laser diode rate equations
- Laser diode
- Laser Doppler velocimetry
- Laser engraving
- Laser integration line
- Laser Interferometer Space Antenna
- Laser Interferometry Space Antenna
- Laser Mégajoule
- Laser Physics (journal)
- Laser Physics Letters
- Laser propulsion
- Laser protection eyewear
- Laser pumping
- Laser rangefinder
- Laser safety
- Laser science
- Laser snow
- Laser ultrasonics
- Laser voltage prober
- Laser
- LaserMotive
- Lasing threshold
- Laszlo B. Kish
- László Tisza
- Latent heat flux
- Latent heat
- Latent internal energy
- Lateral flow test
- Lateral force variation
- Lattice Boltzmann methods
- Lattice constant
- Lattice density functional theory
- Lattice diffusion coefficient
- Lattice field theory
- Lattice gas automaton
- Lattice gauge theory
- Lattice model (physics)
- Lattice QCD
- Laughlin wavefunction
- Laura Bassi
- Laurence E. Peterson
- Laurent Freidel
- Lauro Moscardini
- Lavo Čermelj
- Law of conservation of matter
- Law of the wall
- Lawrence M. Krauss
- Lawrence Paul Horwitz
- Laws of science
- Laws of thermodynamics
- Lawson criterion
- Lax–Friedrichs method
- Lax–Wendroff method
- Lax pair
- Lazare Carnot
- Lazarus effect
- LC circuit
- LCGT
- Le Sage's theory of gravitation
- Lead shielding
- Leader (spark)
- Leading-edge cuff
- Leading-edge extension
- Leading-edge slat
- Leading-edge slot
- Leading edge
- Leakage (electronics)
- Leakage (semiconductors)
- Leaky mode
- Leapfrog integration
- Least count
- Least distance of distinct vision
- Lebedev Physical Institute
- Lebesgue spine
- LeConte Hall
- Lecture Notes in Physics
- Ledinegg instability
- Lee Alvin DuBridge
- Lee C. Teng
- Lee Davenport
- Lee Segel
- Lee Smolin
- Lee wave
- Left-handed material
- Left–right symmetry
- Leidenfrost effect
- Leigh Canham
- Leigh Page
- Leland I. Anderson
- Leland John Haworth
- Lemaître–Tolman metric
- Lemaître coordinates
- Lene Hau
- Length contraction
- Length scale
- Lennard-Jones potential
- Lenoir cycle
- Lens (optics)
- Lens sag
- Lenticular lens
- Lenz's law
- Leo Brewer
- Leo Esaki
- Leo Graetz
- Leo Kadanoff
- Leo Palatnik
- Leó Szilárd
- Léon Brillouin
- Leon Cooper
- Léon Foucault
- Leon Knopoff
- Leon M. Lederman
- Leon Mestel
- Léon Rosenfeld
- Léon Van Hove
- Leona Woods
- Leonard Huxley (physicist)
- Leonard M. Rieser
- Leonard Mandel
- Leonard Mlodinow
- Leonard Ornstein
- Leonard Parker
- Leonard Reiffel
- Leonard Susskind
- Leonard T. Troland
- Leonardo Chiariglione
- Leonhard Euler
- Leonid Brekhovskikh
- Leonid I. Sedov
- Leonid Mandelstam
- Leonid Mikhailovich Shkadov
- Leonid Yatsenko
- Leonidas Resvanis
- Leopold B. Felsen
- Leopold Biwald
- Leopold Infeld
- Leopoldo Máximo Falicov
- Leopoldo Nobili
- LEPS
- LEPS2
- Leptogenesis (physics)
- Lepton epoch
- Lepton mixing matrix
- Lepton number
- Lepton
- Leptoquark
- LeRoy Apker Award (APS)
- LeRoy Apker
- Leroy Dubeck
- LeRoy radius
- Les Houches Accords
- Leslie cube
- Leslie H. Martin
- Leslie Martin (disambiguation)
- Leste
- Lester Germer
- Lester Hogan
- Let There Be Light (Howard Smith book)
- Letter to the Grand Duchess Christina
- Lettere al Nuovo Cimento
- Leucippus
- Lev Artsimovich
- Lev Gor'kov
- Lev Landau
- Lev Lipatov
- Lev Okun
- Lev Pavlovich Rapoport
- Lev Shubnikov
- Lev Vaidman
- Level-set method
- Level-spacing distribution
- Level of free convection
- Lever
- Leverett J-function
- Levi-Civita symbol
- Levitated dipole
- Levitation
- Lew Kowarski
- Lewi Tonks
- Lewis Fry Richardson
- Lewis M. Branscomb
- Lewis number
- Lewis pair
- Lewis Salter
- Leyden jar
- LHC@home
- LHCb
- LHCf
- LHS 3508
- Li Aizhen
- Lianxing Wen
- Lichtenberg figure
- LIDAR
- Lie superalgebra
- Lieb–Liniger model
- Liénard–Wiechert potential
- Liénard equation
- Liesegang rings
- LIESST
- Lift-induced drag
- Lift-to-drag ratio
- Lift (force)
- Lift coefficient
- Lifted condensation level
- Lifting-line theory
- Ligand K-edge
- Light-cone coordinates
- Light-dragging effects
- Light-induced voltage alteration
- Light-water reactor
- Light-year
- Light air
- Light beam
- Light cone gauge
- Light cone
- Light field
- Light front holography
- Light front quantization
- Light pillar
- Light scattering by particles
- Light scattering
- Light
- Lightcraft
- Lighter than air
- Lightest Supersymmetric Particle
- Lighthill mechanism
- Lightning
- LIGO
- Liljequist parhelion
- Limit loads
- Limiting magnitude
- Lincoln Wolfenstein
- Lindblad equation
- Lindblad superoperator
- Line element
- Line of action
- Line of force
- Line source
- Linear-rotational analogs
- Linear acetylenic carbon
- Linear canonical transformation
- Linear combination of atomic orbitals
- Linear compressor
- Linear density
- Linear dynamical system
- Linear elasticity
- Linear energy transfer
- Linear entropy
- Linear flow on the torus
- Linear motion
- Linear particle accelerator
- Linear phase
- Linear polarization
- Linear response function
- Linearised Einstein field equations
- Linearization
- Linearized gravity
- Linus Pauling
- Lionel G. Harrison
- Lionel Robert Wilberforce
- Liouville's theorem (Hamiltonian)
- Liouville dynamical system
- Liouville field theory
- Lippmann–Schwinger equation
- Lippmann electrometer
- Liquefaction of gases
- Liquefaction
- Liquid-crystal laser
- Liquid-crystal polymer
- Liquid bubble
- Liquid crystal
- Liquid drop model
- Liquid fluoride thorium reactor
- Liquid helium
- Liquid hydrogen
- Liquid oxygen
- Liquid Scintillator Neutrino Detector
- Liquid water path
- Liquid
- Liquidus
- Lisa Randall
- Lise Meitner
- Lissajous orbit
- List of accelerator mass spectrometry facilities
- List of accelerators in particle physics
- List of alpha-emitting nuclides
- List of area moments of inertia
- List of atmospheric radiative transfer codes
- List of baryons
- List of black holes
- List of centroids
- List of common physics notations
- List of Cornell Manhattan Project people
- List of cosmic microwave background experiments
- List of cosmologists
- List of Directors General of CERN
- List of dynamical systems and differential equations topics
- List of electromagnetism equations
- List of elementary physics formulae
- List of equations in classical mechanics
- List of equations in fluid mechanics
- List of equations in gravitation
- List of equations in nuclear and particle physics
- List of equations in quantum mechanics
- List of equations in wave theory
- List of experimental errors and frauds in physics
- List of Feynman diagrams
- List of fluid flows named after people
- List of fluid mechanics journals
- List of fusion experiments
- List of fusion power technologies
- List of geophysicists
- List of historic tsunamis
- List of hydrodynamic instabilities named after people
- List of IEEE awards
- List of IEEE societies
- List of important publications in physics
- List of interstellar and circumstellar molecules
- List of Large Hadron Collider experiments
- List of laser applications
- List of laser articles
- List of laser types
- List of lens designs
- List of letters used in mathematics and science
- List of light sources
- List of loop quantum gravity researchers
- List of materials properties
- List of mathematical topics in quantum theory
- List of mathematical topics in relativity
- List of mesons
- List of moments of inertia
- List of National Inventors Hall of Fame inductees
- List of neutrino experiments
- List of Nikola Tesla patents
- List of Nobel laureates in Physics
- List of noise topics
- List of nonlinear partial differential equations
- List of ocean circulation models
- List of orbits
- List of OSA awards
- List of particles
- List of photonics equations
- List of physical quantities
- List of physicists
- List of physics concepts in primary and secondary education curricula
- List of physics journals
- List of plasma (physics) articles
- List of plasma physicists
- List of quantum field theories
- List of quantum gravity researchers
- List of quasiparticles
- List of refractive indices
- List of relativistic equations
- List of rogue waves incidents
- List of scientific constants named after people
- List of scientific publications by Albert Einstein
- List of scientists whose names are used as non SI units
- List of scientists whose names are used as SI units
- List of scientists whose names are used in physical constants
- List of semiconductor materials
- List of standard Gibbs free energies of formation
- List of states of matter
- List of string theory topics
- List of Super Proton Synchrotron experiments
- List of synchrotron radiation facilities
- List of telescope types
- List of textbooks in statistical mechanics
- List of theoretical physicists
- List of thermal conductivities
- List of thermodynamic properties
- List of things named after Albert Einstein
- List of topics characterized as pseudoscience
- List of types of interferometers
- List of unsolved problems in physics
- List of unusual units of measurement
- List of waves named after people
- List of works by Nikolay Bogolyubov
- Listing's law
- Lithium-ion capacitor
- Lithium burning
- Lithium iron phosphate battery
- Lithium Tokamak Experiment
- Lithium triborate
- Little–Parks effect
- Little hierarchy problem
- Little Higgs
- Little string theory
- Liu Chen (physicist)
- Live MOS
- Living Reviews in Relativity
- Living Reviews in Solar Physics
- Liviu Constantinescu
- Llevantades
- Lloyd's mirror
- Lloyd Berkner
- Lloyd Cross
- Load factor (aeronautics)
- Local-density approximation
- Local density of states
- Local hidden-variable theory
- Local Lorentz covariance
- Local oxidation nanolithography
- Local quantum field theory
- Local reference frame
- Local spacetime structure
- Local symmetry
- LOCC
- Lochlainn O'Raifeartaigh
- Lock-in amplifier
- Lockin effect
- Logarithmic conformal field theory
- Logarithmic Schrödinger equation
- Loker Hydrocarbon Research Institute
- London equations
- London field
- London moment
- London penetration depth
- Long-lived fission product
- Long-period fiber grating
- Long-range order
- Long baseline acoustic positioning system
- Long Baseline Neutrino Experiment
- Long delayed echo
- Long Josephson junction
- Long path laser
- Long wavelength limit
- Longitudinal static stability
- Look-elsewhere effect
- Looming and similar refraction phenomena
- Loop braid group
- Loop entropy
- Loop integral
- Loop quantum cosmology
- Loop quantum gravity
- LOPES (telescope)
- Loránd Eötvös
- Loren Acton
- Lorentz-violating neutrino oscillations
- Lorentz–Heaviside units
- Lorentz covariance
- Lorentz ether theory
- Lorentz factor
- Lorentz force velocimetry
- Lorentz force
- Lorentz group
- Lorentz interval
- Lorentz invariance in loop quantum gravity
- Lorentz Medal
- Lorentz scalar
- Lorentz transformation
- Lorenz gauge condition
- Lorenz Hengler
- Lorenz S. Cederbaum
- Lorenzo A. Richards
- Lorin Blodget
- Los Alamos National Laboratory
- Los Alamos Neutron Science Center
- Los Alamos Primer
- Loschmidt's paradox
- Loschmidt constant
- Loss–DiVincenzo quantum computer
- Lossy medium
- Lothar Wolfgang Nordheim
- Lotus effect
- Loudness
- Loudspeaker acoustics
- Louis-Sébastien Lenormand
- Louis Alan Hazeltine
- Louis Alfred Becquerel
- Louis B. Slichter
- Louis de Broglie
- Louis Essen
- Louis Georges Gouy
- Louis Harold Gray
- Louis Michel (physicist)
- Louis Moresi
- Louis Néel
- Louis Paul Cailletet
- Louis Plack Hammett
- Louis Rendu
- Louis Ridenour
- Louis Rosen
- Louis Slotin
- Louis Winslow Austin
- Louis Witten
- Louise Dolan
- Loup Verlet
- Love wave
- Low-dimensional chaos in stellar pulsations
- Low-energy electron diffraction
- Low-g condition
- Low-ionization nuclear emission-line region
- Low-κ dielectric
- Low Earth orbit
- Low Energy Antiproton Ring
- Low Energy Ion Ring
- Low field nuclear magnetic resonance
- Low frequency
- Lower critical solution temperature
- Lower tangent arc
- Loyd A. Jones
- LRAD Corporation
- LSZ reduction formula
- Lubberts effect
- Luboš Motl
- Lubrication theory
- Lubrication
- Lubricity
- Luca Gammaitoni
- Luca Turin
- Lucas cell
- Luciano Maiani
- Luciano Pietronero
- LUCID
- Lucien Hardy
- Lucien LaCoste
- Lucio Russo
- Lucy Jones
- Ludvig Faddeev
- Ludvig Lorenz
- Ludwieg tube
- Ludwig A. Colding
- Ludwig Boltzmann
- Ludwig Hopf
- Ludwig Lange (physicist)
- Ludwig Prandtl
- Ludwig Schupmann
- Ludwig Waldmann
- Ludwig Wilhelm Gilbert
- Ludwig Zehnder
- Ludwik Leibler
- Ludwik Silberstein
- Luigi Galvani
- Luigi Puccianti
- Luis Walter Alvarez
- Luisa Ottolini
- Luise Meyer-Schützmeister
- Luiz Pinguelli Rosa
- Luke's variational principle
- Luke Chia-Liu Yuan
- LULI2000
- Lumen (unit)
- Luminance
- Luminescence
- Luminiferous aether
- Luminophore
- Luminosity distance
- Luminosity function
- Luminosity
- Luminous efficacy
- Luminous energy
- Luminous flux
- Luminous intensity
- Lumped component
- Lumped element model
- Lumped parameters
- Lumpers and splitters
- Lunar eclipse
- Lunar Laser Ranging experiment
- Lunar theory
- Lund string model
- Lundquist number
- Luneburg lens
- Lunitidal interval
- Luttinger's theorem
- Luttinger–Kohn model
- Luttinger liquid
- Luttinger parameter
- Lux
- Lyapunov exponent
- Lyapunov time
- Lyapunov vector
- Lyman-alpha forest
- Lyman-alpha line
- Lyman–Werner photons
- Lyman continuum photons
- Lyman limit
- Lyman series
- Lyn Evans
- Lyoluminescence
- Lyot filter
- Lyot stop
- L–C loaded
