= Laser integration line =

The Laser Integration Line (LIL) is a prototype for the Laser Mégajoule (LMJ) located at CEA-CESTA. Whereas the LMJ is planned to comprise 240 laser beams and deliver 1.8MJ, the LIL delivers just one sixtieth of the energy, 30kJ.
