= List of quantum field theories =

This is a list of quantum field theories. The first few sections are organized according to their matter content, that is, the types of fields appearing in the theory. This is just one of many ways to organize quantum field theories, but reflects the way the subject is taught pedagogically.

== Scalar field theory ==
Theories whose matter content consists of only scalar fields

- Klein-Gordon: free scalar field theory
- φ^{4} theory
- Sine-Gordon
- Toda field theory

== Spinor field theory ==
Theories whose matter content consists only of spinor fields

- Dirac theory: free spinor field theory
- Thirring model
- Nambu–Jona-Lasinio model
- Gross–Neveu model

== Gauge field theory ==
Theories whose matter content consists only of gauge fields

- Yang–Mills theory
- Proca theory
- Chern–Simons theory

== Interacting theories ==
- Spinor and scalar
  - Yukawa model
- Scalar and gauge
  - Scalar electrodynamics
  - Scalar chromodynamics
  - Yang–Mills–Higgs
- Spinor and gauge
  - Quantum electrodynamics (QED)
    - Schwinger model (1+1D case of QED)
  - Quantum chromodynamics (QCD)
- Scalar, spinor and gauge
  - Standard Model

== Sigma models ==
- Chiral model
- Non-linear sigma model
- Wess–Zumino–Witten model

== Supersymmetric quantum field theories ==
- Wess–Zumino model
- Supersymmetric Yang–Mills
- 4D N = 1 global supersymmetry
- Seiberg–Witten theory
- Super QCD (sQCD)

=== Superconformal quantum field theories ===
- N = 4 supersymmetric Yang–Mills theory
- ABJM superconformal field theory
- 6D (2,0) superconformal field theory

=== Supergravity quantum field theories ===
- Pure 4D N = 1 supergravity
- 4D N = 1 supergravity
- Type I supergravity
- Type IIA supergravity
- Type IIB supergravity
- Eleven-dimensional supergravity

== String theories ==
Theories studied in the branch of quantum field theory known as string theory. These theories are without supersymmetry.

- Polyakov action
- Nambu-Goto action
- Bosonic string theory

== Other quantum field theories ==
- Kondo model (s-d model)
- Minimal model (Virasoro minimal model)

== Branches of quantum field theory ==
- String theory
- Conformal field theory
- Supersymmetry
- Topological quantum field theory
- Noncommutative quantum field theory
- Axiomatic quantum field theory
- Local quantum field theory (also known as Algebraic quantum field theory or AQFT)
- Constructive quantum field theory
