= CEA Cesta =

Coordinates: 44°38′55″N 0°47′10″W

CEA-Cesta or simply Cesta (French: Centre d'études scientifiques et techniques d'Aquitaine; English: Center for scientific and technical study of Aquitaine) is a research facility that is part of the Direction des applications militaires (DAM) of the French Atomic Energy Commission (CEA), dedicated to the design of nuclear weapons.

The center was established in 1965 on the commune of Le Barp between Bordeaux and Arcachon.

The center hosts the Megajoule laser (LMJ), which should enable French nuclear scientists to validate models of nuclear explosion without having to conduct nuclear testing. The LMJ is the French equivalent of the National Ignition Facility.
