= Laser snow =

Laser snow is the precipitation through a chemical reaction, condensation and coagulation process, of clustered atoms or molecules, induced by passing a laser beam through certain gasses. It was first observed by Tam, Moe and Happer in 1975, and has since been noted in a number of gases.
