= LArIAT =

LArIAT (Liquid Argon In A Testbeam) is a neutrino experiment located at the Fermi National Accelerator Laboratory (Fermilab), Chicago. It is capable of both accurately identifying and making precise 3D spatial and calorimetric measurements of particles. Currently, it is in the calibration phase of development. At present, the LArIAT collaboration has more than 65 members from 17 institutions worldwide, including Yale University, the University of Manchester, and KEK.

== The LArIAT detector ==
LArIAT itself is a cylindrical cryostat with convex ends, capable of holding 550L of liquid argon. The cryostat is heavily insulated thermally, in part by a region of vacuum surrounding it. Inside the cryostat is the time projection chamber, in which the argon atoms are ionized by beam particles. An electric field is applied across the chamber perpendicular to the beam direction, causing the ionization electrons to move towards the side, where they are detected by two wire planes oriented at ±30° to the vertical. These wire planes are made up of 240 parallel wires with a separation of 4mm. A third wire plane of 225 wires, aligned along the vertical axis, is placed in front of the other two planes in order to prevent the electric field from interfering with the instrumentation.

Ionization of liquid argon emits characteristic 128 nm light (in the violet/ultraviolet range), which is detected by a scintillation read-out system. This system has a high efficiency, having been designed using systems developed for dark matter liquid argon detectors. This gives LArIAT an advantage over other existing liquid argon detectors which are only able to perform calorimetry using the wire grids.
