= Lorentz invariance in loop quantum gravity =

Aspect of loop quantum gravity

In relativistic physics, Lorentz invariance states that the laws of physics should remain unchanged under Lorentz transformation. In quantum gravity, Lorentz invariance measures the universal features in the hypothetical loop quantum gravity universes; which is a hypothetical theory that explains the quantum theory of gravity based on a geometrical interpretation of the theory of relativity. The various hypothetical design models for the universe, multiverse, and loop quantum gravity could have various general covariant principle results.

Because loop quantum gravity can model universes, space-gravity theories are contenders to build and answer unification theory. The Lorentz invariance helps grade the spread of universal features throughout a proposed multiverse in time.

== Grand Unification Epoch ==
The Grand Unification Epoch is the era in time in the chronology of the universe where no elementary particles existed; the three gauge interactions of the Standard Model, which define the electromagnetic and weak and/or strong interactions or forces, are merged into one singular force. Scientific consensus suggests that 3 minutes after the Big Bang: protons and neutrons began to come together to form the nuclei of simple elements. Loop quantum gravity theories, in contrast, place the origin and subsequently, the age of elementary particles, and the age of Lorentz invariance, beyond 13.799 ± 0.021 billion years ago.

The permanence of Lorentz invariance constants is based on elementary particles and their features. There are eons of time before the Big Bang to build the universe from black holes and older multiverses. There is a selective process that creates features in elementary particles, such as accepting, storing, and giving energy. Lee Smolin's books about loop quantum gravity posit that this theory contains the evolutionary ideas of "reproduction" and "mutation" of universes, elementary particles, as well as being formally analogous to models of population biology.

== Earlier universes ==
In the early universes before the Big Bang, there are theories that ''loop quantum gravity" and "loop quantum structures'' formed space. The Lorentz invariance and universal constants describe elementary particles that do not yet exist.

A fecund universe is a multiverse theory by Lee Smolin about the role of black holes. The theory suggests that black holes and loop quantum gravity connected early universes together; that loop quantum gravity can be pulled into black holes, and that within Fecund universes each new universe has slightly different laws of physics. Because these laws are only slightly different, each is assumed to be like a mutation of the early universes.

== Minkowski spacetime ==
Loop quantum gravity (LQG) is a quantization of a classical Lagrangian classical field theory. It is equivalent to the Einstein–Cartan theory in that it leads to the same equations of motion describing general relativity with torsion.

Global Lorentz invariance is broken in LQG as it is broken in general relativity (with the exception of Minkowski spacetime, which is one particular solution of the Einstein field equations). Alternatively, there has been much talk about possible local and global violations of Lorentz invariance beyond those expected in straightforward general relativity.

Further research into whether the LQG analogue of Minkowski spacetime breaks or preserves global Lorentz invariance is needed and Carlo Rovelli and coworkers have recently been investigating the Minkowski state of LQG using spin foam techniques. It is expected that these questions will all remain open as long as the classical limits of various LQG models (see below for the sources of variation) cannot be calculated.

== Lie algebras and loop quantum gravity ==
Mathematically, LQG is local gauge theory of the self-dual subgroup of the EXPANDED Lorentz group, which is related to the action of the Lorentz group on Weyl spinors commonly used in elementary particle physics. This is partly a matter of mathematical convenience, as it results in a compact group SO(3) or SU(2) as gauge group, as opposed to the non-compact groups SO(3,1) or SL(2.C). The compactness of the Lie group avoids some thus-far unsolved difficulties in the quantization of gauge theories of noncompact lie groups, and is responsible for the discreteness of the area and volume spectra. The theory involving the Immirzi parameter is necessary to resolve an ambiguity in the process of complexification. These are some of the many ways in which different quantizations of the same classical theory can result in inequivalent quantum theories, or even in the impossibility to carry quantization through.

It is not possible to distinguish between SO(3) and SU(2) or between SO(3,1) and SL(2,C) at this level: the respective Lie algebras are the same. All four groups have the same complexified Lie algebra and these subtleties are usually ignored in elementary particle physics. The physical interpretation of the Lie algebra is that of infinitesimally small group transformations, and gauge bosons (such as the graviton) are Lie algebra representations, not Lie group representations. This means for the Lorentz group that, for sufficiently small velocity parameters, all four complexified Lie groups are indistinguishable in the absence of matter fields.

Adding to the complexity, it can be shown that a positive cosmological constant can be realized in LQG by replacing the Lorentz group with the corresponding quantum group. At the level of the Lie algebra, this corresponds to what is called q-deforming the Lie algebra, and the parameter q is related to the value of the cosmological constant. The effect of replacing a Lie algebra by a q-deformed version is that the series of its representations is truncated. In the case of the rotation group, instead of having representations labelled by all half-integral spins, all representations with total spin j less than some constant remain.

It is possible to formulate LQG in terms of q-deformed Lie algebras instead of ordinary Lie algebras, and in the case of the Lorentz group, the result would, again, be indistinguishable for sufficiently small velocity parameters.

== Spin networks loop quantum gravity ==
In the spin-foam formalism, the Barrett–Crane model, which was for a while the most promising state-sum model of 4D Lorentzian quantum gravity, was based on representations of the noncompact groups SO(3,1) or SL(2,C), so the spin foam faces (and hence the spin network edges) were labelled by positive real numbers as opposed to the half-integer labels of SU(2) spin networks.

These and other considerations, including difficulties interpreting what it would mean to apply a Lorentz transformation to a spin network state, led Lee Smolin and others to suggest that spin network states must break Lorentz invariance. Smolin and Joao Magueijo then went on to study doubly special relativity, in which not only there is a constant velocity c but also a constant distance l. They showed that there are nonlinear representations of the Lorentz Lie algebra with these properties (the usual Lorentz group being obtained from a linear representation). Doubly special relativity predicts deviations from the special relativity dispersion relation at large energies (corresponding to small wavelengths of the order of the constant length l in the doubly special theory). Giovanni Amelino-Camelia then proposed that the mystery of ultra-high-energy cosmic rays might be solved by assuming such violations of the special-relativity dispersion relation for photons. No confirmation has yet been found, and this idea is still hypothetical.

Phenomenological (hence, not specific to LQG) constraints on anomalous dispersion relations can be obtained by considering a variety of astrophysical experimental data, of which high-energy cosmic rays are one part.

== Observational Data Fails To Detect Lorentz Invariance ==
Published in 2024, the Large High Altitude Air Shower Observatory Collaborative examined the gamma ray output from GRB 221009A and was unable to detect any invariance based on the color (wavelength) of light, something Loop Quantum Gravity predicts should happen.
