= Lagrangian analysis =

Lagrangian analysis is the use of Lagrangian coordinates to analyze various problems in continuum mechanics.

Lagrangian analysis may be used to analyze currents and flows of various materials by analyzing data collected from gauges/sensors embedded in the material which freely move with the motion of the material. A common application is study of ocean currents in oceanography, where the movable gauges in question called Lagrangian drifters.

Recently, with the development of high speed cameras and particle-tracking algorithms, there have also been applications to measuring turbulence.
