= Liquid-crystal laser =

Type of laser

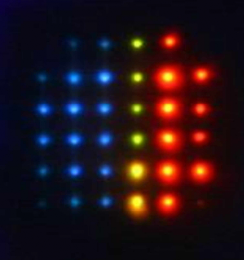
Liquid-crystal laser (LCL) test

A liquid-crystal laser is a laser that uses a liquid crystal as the resonator cavity, allowing selection of emission wavelength and polarization from the active laser medium. The lasing medium is usually a dye doped into the liquid crystal. Liquid-crystal lasers are comparable in size to diode lasers, but provide the continuous wide spectrum tunability of dye lasers while maintaining a large coherence area. The tuning range is typically several tens of nanometers. Self-organization at micrometer scales reduces manufacturing complexity compared to using layered photonic metamaterials. Operation may be either in continuous wave mode or in pulsed mode.

== History ==
Distributed feedback lasing using Bragg reflection of a periodic structure instead of external mirrors was first proposed in 1971, predicted theoretically with cholesteric liquid crystals in 1978, achieved experimentally in 1980, and explained in terms of a photonic band gap in 1998. A United States Patent issued in 1973 described a liquid-crystal laser that uses "a liquid lasing medium having internal distributed feedback by virtue of the molecular structure of a cholesteric liquid-crystal material."

== Mechanism ==
Starting with a liquid crystal in the nematic phase, the desired helical pitch (the distance along the helical axis for one complete rotation of the nematic plane subunits) can be achieved by doping the liquid crystal with a chiral molecule. For light circularly polarized with the same handedness, this regular modulation of the refractive index yields selective reflection of the wavelength given by the helical pitch, allowing the liquid-crystal laser to serve as its own resonator cavity. Photonic crystals are amenable to band theory methods, with the periodic dielectric structure playing the role of the periodic electric potential and a photonic band gap (reflection notch) corresponding to forbidden frequencies. The lower photon group velocity and higher density of states near the photonic bandgap suppresses spontaneous emission and enhances stimulated emission, providing favorable conditions for lasing. If the electronic band edge falls in the photonic bandgap, electron-hole recombination is strictly suppressed. This allows for devices with high lasing efficiency, low lasing threshold, and stable frequency, where the liquid-crystal laser acts its own waveguide. "Colossal" nonlinear change in refractive index is achievable in doped nematic-phase liquid crystals, that is the refractive index can change with illumination intensity at a rate of about 10^{3}cm^{2}/W of illumination intensity. Most systems use a semiconductor pumping laser to achieve population inversion, though flash lamp and electrical pumping systems are possible.

Tuning of the output wavelength is achieved by smoothly varying the helical pitch: as the winding changes, so does the length scale of the crystal. This in turn shifts the band edge and changes the optical path length in the lasing cavity. Applying a static electric field perpendicular to the dipole moment of the local nematic phase rotates the rod-like subunits in the hexagonal plane and reorders the chiral phase, winding or unwinding the helical pitch. Similarly, optical tuning of the output wavelength is available using laser light far from the pick-up frequency of the gain medium, with degree of rotation governed by intensity and the angle between the polarization of the incident light and the dipole moment. Reorientation is stable and reversible. The chiral pitch of a cholesteric phase tends to unwind with increasing temperature, with a disorder-order transition to the higher symmetry nematic phase at the high end. By applying a temperature gradient perpendicular to the direction of emission varying the location of stimulation, frequency may be selected across a continuous spectrum. Similarly, a quasi-continuous doping gradient yields multiple laser lines from different locations on the same sample. Spatial tuning may also be accomplished using a wedge cell. The boundary conditions of the narrower cell squeeze the helical pitch by requiring a particular orientation at the edge, with discrete jumps where the outer cells rotate to the next stable orientation; frequency variation between jumps is continuous.

If a defect is introduced into the liquid crystal to disturb the periodicity, a single allowed mode may be created inside of the photonic bandgap, reducing power leeching by spontaneous emission at adjacent frequencies. Defect mode lasing was first predicted in 1987, and was demonstrated in 2003.

While most such thin films lase on the axis normal to the film's surface, some will lase on a conic angle around that axis.

== Applications ==
- Biomedical sensing: small size, low cost, and low power consumption offer a variety of advantages in biomedical sensing applications. Potentially, liquid-crystal lasers could form the basis for "lab on a chip" devices that provide immediate readings without sending a sample away to a separate lab.
- Medical: low emission power limits such medical procedures as cutting during surgeries, but liquid-crystal lasers show potential to be used in microscopy techniques and in vivo techniques such as photodynamic therapy.
- Display screens: liquid-crystal-laser-based displays offer most of the advantages of standard liquid-crystal displays, but the low spectral spread gives more precise control over color. Individual elements are small enough to act as single pixels while retaining high brightness and color definition. A system in which each pixel is a single spatially tuned device could avoid the sometimes long relaxation times of dynamic tuning, and could emit any color using spatial addressing and the same monochromatic pumping source.
- Environmental sensing: using a material with a helical pitch highly sensitive to temperature, electric field, magnetic field, or mechanical strain, color shift of the output laser provides a simple, direct measurement of environmental conditions.

== Bibliography ==
- Woltman, Scott J.; Crawford, Gregory Philip; Jay, Gregory D. (2007). Liquid crystals: frontiers in biomedical applications. World Scientific. ISBN 978-981-270-545-7.
