= Lockin effect =

In superconductivity, the Lockin effect refers to the preference of vortex phases to be positioned at certain points within cells of a crystal lattice of an organic superconductor.
