= Lionel G. Harrison =

Lionel George Harrison (May 29, 1929 – March 17, 2008) was a physical chemist, theoretical biologist, and the author of the 1993 book, Kinetic Theory of Living Pattern, which approaches problems in developmental biology from the standpoint of physical science and mathematics.

Born in Liverpool, England, Harrison studied physical chemistry at the University of Liverpool, obtaining a doctorate from that university in 1952. From 1956, he was a member of the faculty at the University of British Columbia in Vancouver, British Columbia, Canada, attaining full professor status in 1967. Harrison became interested in biological development in the early 1970s and focussed his research efforts in that field for the remainder of his life. The Shaping of Life, a second book on models of morphogenesis, was published posthumously in 2010.
