= Loop braid group =

Three dimensional group structure

The loop braid group is a mathematical group structure that is used in some models of theoretical physics to model the exchange of particles with loop-like topologies within three dimensions of space and time.

The basic operations which generate a loop braid group for n loops are exchanges of two adjacent loops, and passing one adjacent loop through another. The topology forces these generators to satisfy some relations, which determine the group.

To be precise, the loop braid group on n loops is defined as the motion group of n disjoint circles embedded in a compact three-dimensional "box" diffeomorphic to the three-dimensional disk. A motion is a loop in the configuration space, which consists of all possible ways of embedding n circles into the 3-disk. This becomes a group in the same way as loops in any space can be made into a group; first, we define equivalence classes of loops by letting paths g and h be equivalent iff they are related by a (smooth) homotopy, and then we define a group operation on the equivalence classes by concatenation of paths. In his 1962 Ph.D. thesis, David M. Dahm was able to show that there is an injective homomorphism from this group into the automorphism group of the free group on n generators, so it is natural to identify the group with this subgroup of the automorphism group. One may also show that the loop braid group is isomorphic to the welded braid group, as is done for example in a paper by John C. Baez, Derek Wise, and Alissa Crans, which also gives some presentations of the loop braid group using the work of Xiao-Song Lin.

== See also ==
- Braid group
