= List of Cornell Manhattan Project people =

Scientists from Cornell University played a major role in developing the technology that resulted in the first atomic bombs used in World War II. In turn, Cornell Physics professor Hans Bethe used the project as an opportunity to recruit young scientists to join the Cornell faculty after the war. The following people worked on the Manhattan Project primarily in Los Alamos, New Mexico during World War II and either studied or taught at Cornell University before or after the War:

- Robert Fox Bacher – headed the experimental physics division, Cornell Physics professor from 1935 until the War
- Manson Benedict – developed the gaseous diffusion method for separating the isotopes of uranium and supervised the engineering and process development of the K-25 plant in Oak Ridge, Tennessee, where fissionable material for the atomic bomb was produced
- Hans Bethe – director of the theoretical division
- Gertrude Blanch – oversaw calculations for the Manhattan Project
- Oswald C. Brewster – Cornell class of 1918, project engineer who wrote to senior government officials warning about the potential of atomic bombs ending civilization.
- Walter S. Carpenter Jr. – oversaw the DuPont company's involvement in the Manhattan Project
- Frederick J. Clarke – master's degree in civil engineering from Cornell University in 1940
- Dale R. Corson – later became President of Cornell
- John Curtin – Cornell theoretical physics Ph.D. class of 1943
- Jean Klein Dayton – helped design detonation systems
- John W. DeWire – Cornell physics faculty
- Richard Davisson – worked in Special Engineer Detachment
- Eleanor & Richard Ehrlich
- Richard Feynman – team leader under Bethe, later taught Physics at Cornell
- Kenneth Greisen – worked on instrumentation, later Cornell Physics faculty
- Lottie Grieff
- William Higinbotham – headed the electronics group
- Marshall Holloway – PhD from Cornell
- Henry Hurwitz Jr. – Cornell class of 1938
- Walter Kauzmann – in charge of producing the detonator for the Trinity test
- Margaret Ramsey Keck
- Giovanni Rossi Lomanitz – worked at the Berkeley Radiation Laboratory; doctorate in theoretical physics from Cornell University, where he was the first graduate student of Richard Feynman.
- Robert Marshak – PhD from Cornell University in 1939
- Boyce McDaniel – later became director of Cornell's Laboratory of Nuclear Studies
- William T. Miller – developed the chlorofluorocarbon polymer used in the first gaseous diffusion plant for the separation of uranium isotopes, Cornell chemistry faculty, 1936 – 1977
- Elliott Waters Montroll – Head of the Mathematics Research Group at the Kellex Corporation in New York, working on programs associated with the Manhattan Project.
- Philip Morrison – Cornell physics faculty 1946 – 1964.
- Kenneth Nichols – deputy to General Leslie Groves, ME from Cornell
- Paul Olum – later became President of the University of Oregon
- Lyman G. Parrett – Cornell physics faculty
- Arthur V. Peterson – Manhattan District's Chicago Area Engineer, responsible for the Metallurgical Laboratory
- Edith Hinkley Quimby
- Marcia White Rosenthal
- Bruno Rossi – co-director of the Detector Group, Cornell physics faculty 1942-1946
- Harvey L. Slatin – physicist and inventor who worked on the isolation of plutonium with the Special Engineering Detachment
- LaRoy Thompson – Cornell class of 1942, physically assembled the first bomb and flew the practice bombing run at Bikini Island. Later, senior vice president and treasurer of the University of Rochester
- Robert R. Wilson – head of the Cyclotron Group (R-1)
- William M. Woodward – Cornell physics faculty
