= Light-cone coordinates =

Coordinate system in special relativity

In physics, particularly special relativity, light-cone coordinates, introduced by Paul Dirac and also known as Dirac coordinates, are a special coordinate system where two coordinate axes combine both space and time, while all the others are spatial.

== Motivation ==
A spacetime plane may be associated with the plane of split-complex numbers which is acted upon by elements of the unit hyperbola to effect Lorentz boosts. This number plane has axes corresponding to time and space. An alternative basis is the diagonal basis which corresponds to light-cone coordinates.

== Light-cone coordinates in special relativity ==
In a light-cone coordinate system, two of the coordinates are with respect to null vectors and all the other coordinates are spatial. The former can be denoted $x^+$ and $x^-$ and the latter $x_\perp$.

Assume we are working with a (d,1) Lorentzian signature.

Instead of the standard coordinate system (using Einstein notation)

$$ds^2=-dt^2+\delta_{ij}dx^i dx^j$$,

with $i,j=1,\dots,d$ we have

$$ds^2=-2dx^+dx^- + \delta_{ij}dx^i dx^j$$

with $i,j=1,\dots,d-1$, $x^+=\frac{t+x}{\sqrt{2}}$ and $x^-=\frac{t-x}{\sqrt{2}}$.

Both $x^+$ and $x^-$ can act as "time" coordinates.

One nice thing about light cone coordinates is that the causal structure is partially included into the coordinate system itself.

A boost in the $(t,x)$ plane shows up as the squeeze mapping $x^+ \to e^{+\beta}x^+$, $x^- \to e^{-\beta}x^-$, $x^i \to x^i$. A rotation in the $(i,j)$-plane only affects $x_\perp$.

The parabolic transformations show up as $x^+ \to x^+$, $x^- \to x^- + \delta_{ij}\alpha^i x^j + \frac{\alpha^2}{2} x^+$, $x^i \to x^i + \alpha^i x^+$. Another set of parabolic transformations show up as $x^+ \to x^+ + \delta_{ij}\alpha^i x^j + \frac{\alpha^2}{2} x^-$, $x^- \to x^-$ and $x^i \to x^i + \alpha^i x^-$.

Light cone coordinates can also be generalized to curved spacetime in general relativity. Sometimes calculations simplify using light cone coordinates. See Newman–Penrose formalism. Light cone coordinates are sometimes used to describe relativistic collisions, especially if the relative velocity is very close to the speed of light. They are also used in the light cone gauge of string theory.

== Light-cone coordinates in string theory ==
A closed string is a generalization of a particle. The spatial coordinate of a point on the string is conveniently described by a parameter $\sigma$ which runs from $0$ to $2\pi$. Time is appropriately described by a parameter $\sigma_0$. Associating each point on the string in a D-dimensional spacetime with coordinates $x_0, x$ and transverse coordinates $x_i, i=2,...,D$, these coordinates play the role of fields in a $1+1$ dimensional field theory. Clearly, for such a theory more is required. It is convenient to employ instead of $x_0=\sigma_0$ and $x$, light-cone coordinates $x_{\pm}$ given by

$$x_{\pm}=\frac{1}{\sqrt 2}(x_0 \pm x)$$

so that the metric $ds^2$ is given by

$$ds^2 = 2dx_+dx_- -(dx_i)^2$$

(summation over $i$ understood). There is some gauge freedom. First, we can set $x_+=\sigma_0$ and treat this degree of freedom as the time variable. A reparameterization invariance under $\sigma \rightarrow \sigma + \delta\sigma$ can be imposed with a constraint ${\mathcal L}_0 =0$ which we obtain from the metric, i.e.

$${\mathcal L}_0 = \frac{dx_-}{d\sigma} - \frac{dx_i}{d\sigma}\frac{dx_i}{d\sigma_0}=0.$$

Thus $x_-$ is not an independent degree of freedom anymore. Now ${\mathcal L}_0$ can be identified as the corresponding Noether charge. Consider ${\mathcal L}_0(x_-,x_i)$. Then with the use of the Euler-Lagrange equations for $x_i$ and $x_-$ one obtains

$$\delta{\mathcal L}_0 = \frac{\partial}{\partial \sigma}\bigg(\frac{\partial {\mathcal L}_0}{\partial(\partial x_i/\partial \sigma)}\delta x_i + \delta x_-\bigg).$$

Equating this to

$$\delta{\mathcal L}_0 = \frac{\partial}{\partial \sigma}(Q\delta\sigma),$$

where $Q$ is the Noether charge, we obtain:

$$Q=\frac{\partial{\mathcal L}_0}{\partial(\partial x_i/\partial\sigma)}\frac{\delta x_i}{\delta \sigma}
+ \frac{\delta x_-}{\delta \sigma}
= -\frac{dx_i}{d\sigma_0}\frac{\delta x_i}{\delta \sigma}
+ \frac{\delta x_-}{\delta \sigma} = {\mathcal L}_0.$$

This result agrees with a result cited in the literature.

== Free particle motion in light-cone coordinates ==
For a free particle of mass $m$ the action is

$$S=\int{\mathcal L}d\sigma, \;\;\; {\mathcal L} = -\frac{1}{2}\bigg[\frac{dx^{\mu}}{d\sigma}\frac{dx_{\mu}}{d\sigma} +m^2\bigg].$$

In light-cone coordinates ${\mathcal L}$ becomes with $\sigma = x_+$ as time variable:

$${\mathcal L} = -\frac{dx_-}{d\sigma} + \frac{1}{2}\bigg(\frac{dx_i}{d\sigma}\bigg)^2 - \frac{m^2}{2}.$$

The canonical momenta are

$$p_-=\frac{\partial {\mathcal L}}{\partial(dx_-/d\sigma)}= -1, \;\;\; p_i =\frac{\partial {\mathcal L}}{\partial( dx_i/d\sigma)}=\frac{dx_i}{d\sigma}.$$

The Hamiltonian is ($\hbar = c = 1$):

$${\mathcal H} = \dot{x}_-p_- + \dot{x}_ip_i - {\mathcal L} = \frac{1}{2}p_i^2 + \frac{1}{2}m^2,$$

and the nonrelativistic Hamilton equations imply:

$$x_i(\sigma) = p_i\sigma + {\it const.}.$$

One can now extend this to a free string.

== See also ==
- Newman–Penrose formalism
