= Light cone gauge =

In theoretical physics, light cone gauge is an approach to remove the ambiguities arising from a gauge symmetry. While the term refers to several situations, a null component of a field A is set to zero (or a simple function of other variables) in all cases.

The advantage of light-cone gauge is that fields, e.g. gluons in the QCD case, are transverse. Consequently, all ghosts and other unphysical degrees of freedom are eliminated. The disadvantage is that some symmetries such as Lorentz symmetry become obscured (they become non-manifest, i.e. hard to prove).

== Gauge theory ==
In gauge theory, light-cone gauge refers to the condition $A^+=0$ where

$$A^+ (x^0,x^1,x^2,x^3) = A^0 (x^0,x^1,x^2,x^3) +A^3 (x^0,x^1,x^2,x^3)$$

It is a method to get rid of the redundancies implied by Yang–Mills symmetry.

== String theory ==
In string theory, light-cone gauge fixes the reparameterization invariance on the world sheet by

$$X^+(\sigma, \tau) = p^+ \tau$$

where $p^+$ is a constant and $\tau$ is the worldsheet time.

== See also ==
- light cone coordinates
