= Leslie Martin (disambiguation) =

Leslie Martin (1908–2000) was an English architect.

Leslie, Lesley or Les Martin may also refer to:

- Leslie H. Martin (1900–1983), Australian physicist and professor
- Leslie Dale Martin (1967–2002), American murderer
- Lesley Martin, New Zealand pro-euthanasia activist
