= Little string theory =

In theoretical physics, little string theory is a non-gravitational non-local theory in six spacetime dimensions that can be obtained as an effective theory of NS5-branes in the limit in which gravity decouples. Little string theories exhibit T-duality, much like the full string theory.
