= Quartic interaction =

Quantum field theory with four-point interactions

In quantum field theory, a quartic interaction or φ^{4} theory is a type of self-interaction of a scalar field. Other types of quartic interactions may be found under the topic of four-fermion interactions. A classical free scalar field $\varphi$ satisfies the Klein–Gordon equation. If a scalar field is denoted $\varphi$, a quartic interaction is represented by adding an interaction energy term $({\lambda}/{4!}) \varphi^4$ to the Lagrangian density. The coupling constant $\lambda$ is dimensionless in 4-dimensional spacetime.

This article uses the $(+ - - -)$ metric signature for Minkowski space.

== Lagrangian for a massive, real scalar field ==
The Lagrangian density for a massive, real scalar field with a quartic interaction is

$$\mathcal{L}(\varphi)=\frac{1}{2} [\partial^\mu \varphi \partial_\mu \varphi -m^2 \varphi^2] -\frac{\lambda}{4!} \varphi^4.$$

The first term between the brackets is the energy related to the four-momentum of the particle, the second term describes its restmass energy.

This Lagrangian has a global Z_{2} symmetry mapping $\varphi\to-\varphi$.

== Lagrangian for a complex scalar field ==
The Lagrangian for a complex scalar field can be motivated as follows. For two scalar fields $\varphi_1$ and $\varphi_2$ the Lagrangian has the form

$$\mathcal{L}(\varphi_1,\varphi_2) =
\frac{1}{2} [ \partial_\mu \varphi_1 \partial^\mu \varphi_1 - m^2 \varphi_1^2]
+ \frac{1}{2} [ \partial_\mu \varphi_2 \partial^\mu \varphi_2 - m^2 \varphi_2^2]
- \frac{1}{4} \lambda (\varphi_1^2 + \varphi_2^2)^2,$$

which can be written more concisely introducing a complex scalar field $\phi$ defined as

$$\phi \equiv \frac{1}{\sqrt{2}} (\varphi_1 + i \varphi_2),$$
$$\phi^* \equiv \frac{1}{\sqrt{2}} (\varphi_1 - i \varphi_2).$$

Expressed in terms of this complex scalar field, the above Lagrangian becomes

$$\mathcal{L}(\phi)=\partial^\mu \phi^* \partial_\mu \phi -m^2 \phi^* \phi -\lambda (\phi^* \phi)^2,$$

which is thus equivalent to the SO(2) model of real scalar fields $\varphi_1, \varphi_2$, as can be seen by expanding the complex field $\phi$ in real and imaginary parts.

With $N$ real scalar fields, we can have a $\varphi^4$ model with a global SO(N) symmetry given by the Lagrangian

$$\mathcal{L}(\varphi_1,...,\varphi_N)=\frac{1}{2} [\partial^\mu \varphi_a \partial_\mu \varphi_a - m^2 \varphi_a \varphi_a] -\frac{1}{4} \lambda (\varphi_a \varphi_a)^2, \quad a=1,...,N.$$

Expanding the complex field in real and imaginary parts shows that it is equivalent to the SO(2) model of real scalar fields.

In all of the models above, the coupling constant $\lambda$ must be positive, since otherwise the potential would be unbounded below, and there would be no stable vacuum. Also, the Feynman path integral discussed below would be ill-defined. In 4 dimensions, $\phi^4$ theories have a Landau pole. This means that without a cut-off on the high-energy scale, renormalization would render the theory trivial.

The $\phi^4$ model belongs to the Griffiths-Simon class, meaning that it can be represented also as the weak limit of an Ising model on a certain type of graph. The triviality of both the $\phi^4$ model and the Ising model in $d\geq 4$ can be shown via a graphical representation known as the random current expansion.

== Feynman integral quantization ==
The Feynman diagram expansion may be obtained also from the Feynman path integral formulation. The time-ordered vacuum expectation values of polynomials in φ, known as the n-particle Green's functions, are constructed by integrating over all possible fields, normalized by the vacuum expectation value with no external fields,

$$\langle\Omega|\mathcal{T}\{{\phi}(x_1)\cdots {\phi}(x_n)\}|\Omega\rangle=\frac{\int \mathcal{D}\phi \phi(x_1)\cdots \phi(x_n) e^{i\int d^4x \left({1\over 2}\partial^\mu \phi \partial_\mu \phi -{m^2 \over 2}\phi^2-{\lambda\over 4!}\phi^4\right)}}{\int \mathcal{D}\phi e^{i\int d^4x \left({1\over 2}\partial^\mu \phi \partial_\mu \phi -{m^2 \over 2}\phi^2-{\lambda\over 4!}\phi^4\right)}}.$$

All of these Green's functions may be obtained by expanding the exponential in J(x)φ(x) in the generating function

$$Z[J] =\int \mathcal{D}\phi e^{i\int d^4x \left({1\over 2}\partial^\mu \phi \partial_\mu \phi -{m^2 \over 2}\phi^2-{\lambda\over 4!}\phi^4+J\phi\right)} = Z[0] \sum_{n=0}^{\infty} \frac{1}{n!} \langle\Omega|\mathcal{T}\{{\phi}(x_1)\cdots {\phi}(x_n)\}|\Omega\rangle.$$

A Wick rotation may be applied to make time imaginary. Changing the signature to (++++) then gives a φ^{4} statistical mechanics integral over a 4-dimensional Euclidean space,

$$Z[J]=\int \mathcal{D}\phi e^{-\int d^4x \left({1\over 2}(\nabla\phi)^2+{m^2 \over 2}\phi^2+{\lambda\over 4!}\phi^4+J\phi\right)}.$$

Normally, this is applied to the scattering of particles with fixed momenta, in which case, a Fourier transform is useful, giving instead

$$\tilde{Z}[\tilde{J}]=\int \mathcal{D}\tilde\phi e^{-\int d^4p \left({1\over 2}(p^2+m^2)\tilde\phi^2-\tilde{J}\tilde\phi+{\lambda\over 4!}{\int {d^4p_1 \over (2\pi)^4}{d^4p_2 \over (2\pi)^4}{d^4p_3 \over (2\pi)^4}\delta(p-p_1-p_2-p_3)\tilde\phi(p)\tilde\phi(p_1)\tilde\phi(p_2)\tilde\phi(p_3)}\right)}.$$

where $\delta(x)$ is the Dirac delta function.

The standard trick to evaluate this functional integral is to write it as a product of exponential factors, schematically,

$$\tilde{Z}[\tilde{J}]=\int \mathcal{D}\tilde\phi \prod_p \left[e^{-(p^2+m^2)\tilde\phi^2/2} e^{-\lambda/4!\int {d^4p_1 \over (2\pi)^4}{d^4p_2 \over (2\pi)^4}{d^4p_3 \over (2\pi)^4}\delta(p-p_1-p_2-p_3)\tilde\phi(p)\tilde\phi(p_1)\tilde\phi(p_2)\tilde\phi(p_3)} e^{\tilde{J}\tilde\phi}\right].$$

The second two exponential factors can be expanded as power series, and the combinatorics of this expansion can be represented graphically. The integral with λ = 0 can be treated as a product of infinitely many elementary Gaussian integrals, and the result may be expressed as a sum of Feynman diagrams, calculated using the following Feynman rules:

- Each field $\tilde{\phi}(p)$ in the n-point Euclidean Green's function is represented by an external line (half-edge) in the graph, and associated with momentum p.
- Each vertex is represented by a factor -λ.
- At a given order λ^{k}, all diagrams with n external lines and k vertices are constructed such that the momenta flowing into each vertex is zero. Each internal line is represented by a factor 1/(q^{2} + m^{2}), where q is the momentum flowing through that line.
- Any unconstrained momenta are integrated over all values.
- The result is divided by a symmetry factor, which is the number of ways the lines and vertices of the graph can be rearranged without changing its connectivity.
- Do not include graphs containing "vacuum bubbles", connected subgraphs with no external lines.

The last rule takes into account the effect of dividing by $\tilde{Z}[0]$. The Minkowski-space Feynman rules are similar, except that each vertex is represented by $-i\lambda$, while each internal line is represented by a factor i/(q^{2}-m^{2} + i ε), where the ε term represents the small Wick rotation needed to make the Minkowski-space Gaussian integral converge.

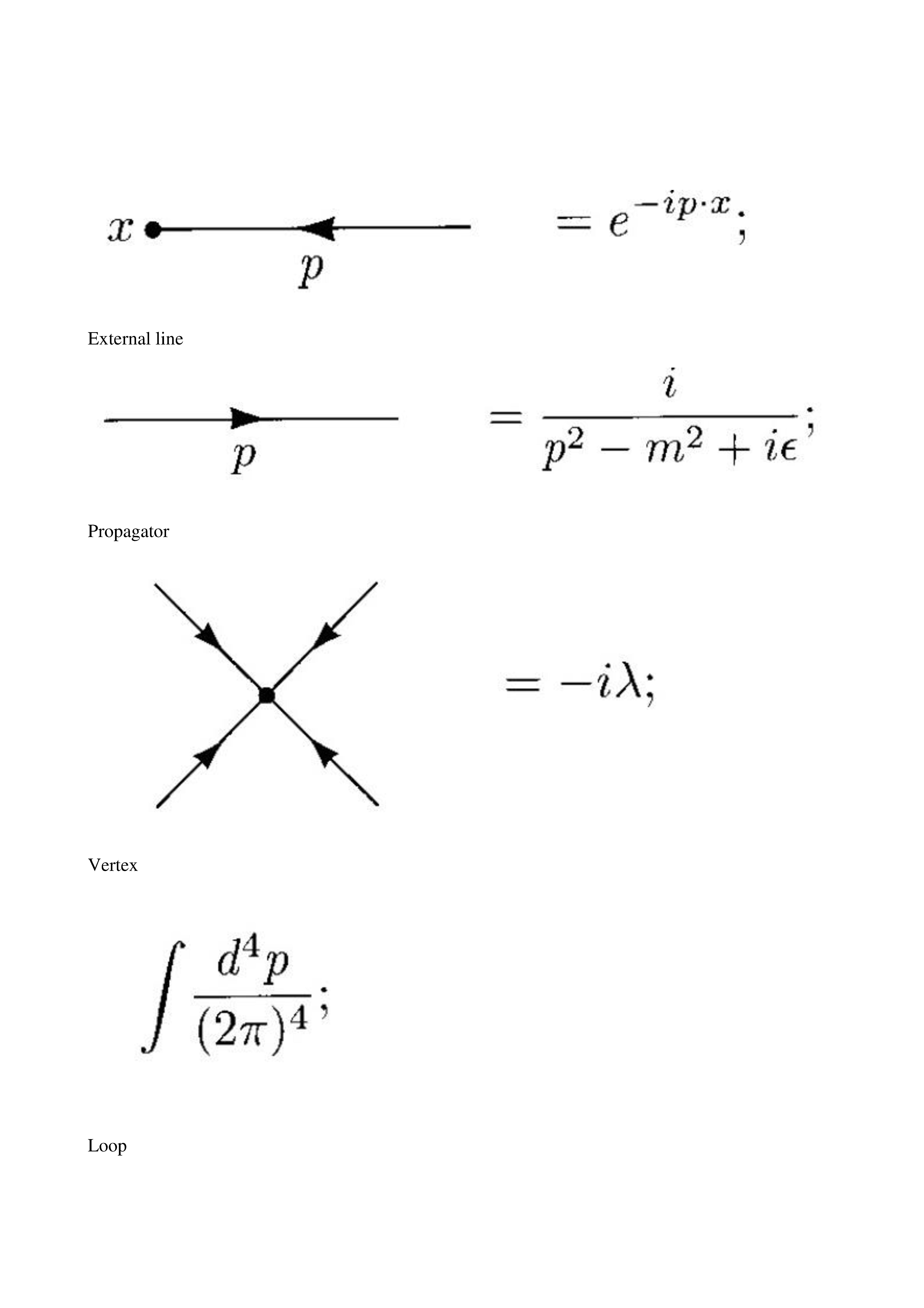

== Renormalization ==
The integrals over unconstrained momenta, called "loop integrals", in the Feynman graphs typically diverge. This is normally handled by renormalization, which is a procedure of adding divergent counter-terms to the Lagrangian in such a way that the diagrams constructed from the original Lagrangian and counterterms are finite. A renormalization scale must be introduced in the process, and the coupling constant and mass become dependent upon it. It is this dependence that leads to the Landau pole mentioned earlier, and requires that the cutoff be kept finite.

== Spontaneous symmetry breaking ==
An interesting feature can occur if m^{2} turns negative, but with λ still positive. In this case, the vacuum consists of two lowest-energy states, each of which spontaneously breaks the Z_{2} global symmetry of the original theory. This leads to the appearance of interesting collective states like domain walls. In the O(2) theory, the vacua would lie on a circle, and the choice of one would spontaneously break the O(2) symmetry. A continuous broken symmetry leads to a Goldstone boson. This type of spontaneous symmetry breaking is the essential component of the Higgs mechanism.

=== Spontaneous breaking of discrete symmetries ===
The simplest relativistic system in which we can see spontaneous symmetry breaking is one with a single scalar field $\varphi$ with Lagrangian

$$\mathcal{L}(\varphi) = \frac{1}{2} (\partial \varphi)^2 + \frac{1}{2}\mu^2 \varphi^2 - \frac{1}{4} \lambda \varphi^4 \equiv \frac{1}{2} (\partial \varphi)^2 - V(\varphi),$$

where $\mu^2 > 0$ and

$$V(\varphi) \equiv - \frac{1}{2}\mu^2 \varphi^2 + \frac{1}{4} \lambda \varphi^4.$$

Minimizing the potential with respect to $\varphi$ leads to

$$V'(\varphi_0) = 0 \Longleftrightarrow \varphi_0^2 \equiv v^2 = \frac{2\mu^2}{\lambda}.$$

We now expand the field around this minimum writing

$$\varphi(x) = v + \sigma(x),$$

and substituting in the lagrangian we get

$$\mathcal{L}(\varphi) =
\underbrace{-\frac{\mu^4}{4\lambda}}_{\text{unimportant constant}}
+ \underbrace{\frac{1}{2} [( \partial \sigma)^2 - (\sqrt{2}\mu)^2 \sigma^2 ]}_{\text{massive scalar field}}
+ \underbrace{ (-\lambda v \sigma^3 - \frac{\lambda}{4} \sigma^4) }_{\text{self-interactions}}.$$

where we notice that the scalar $\sigma$ has now a positive mass term.

Thinking in terms of vacuum expectation values lets us understand what happens to a symmetry when it is spontaneously broken. The original Lagrangian was invariant under the $Z_2$ symmetry $\varphi \rightarrow -\varphi$. Since

$$\langle \Omega | \varphi | \Omega \rangle = \pm \sqrt{ \frac{6\mu^2}{\lambda} }$$

are both minima, there must be two different vacua: $|\Omega_\pm \rangle$ with

$$\langle \Omega_\pm | \varphi | \Omega_\pm \rangle = \pm \sqrt{ \frac{6\mu^2}{\lambda} }.$$

Since the $Z_2$ symmetry takes $\varphi \rightarrow -\varphi$, it must take $| \Omega_+ \rangle \leftrightarrow | \Omega_- \rangle$ as well. The two possible vacua for the theory are equivalent, but one has to be chosen. Although it seems that in the new Lagrangian the $Z_2$ symmetry has disappeared, it is still there, but it now acts as $\sigma \rightarrow -\sigma - 2v.$ This is a general feature of spontaneously broken symmetries: the vacuum breaks them, but they are not actually broken in the Lagrangian, just hidden, and often realized only in a nonlinear way.

== Exact solutions ==
There exists a set of exact classical solutions to the equation of motion of the theory written in the form

$$\partial^2\varphi+\mu_0^2\varphi+\lambda\varphi^3=0$$

that can be written for the massless, $\mu_0=0$, case as

$$\varphi(x) = \pm\mu\left(\frac{2}{\lambda}\right)^{1\over 4}{\rm sn}(p\cdot x+\theta,i),$$

where $\, \rm sn\!$ is the Jacobi elliptic sine function and $\,\mu,\theta$ are two integration constants, provided the following dispersion relation holds

$$p^2=\mu^2\left(\frac{\lambda}{2}\right)^{1\over 2}.$$

The interesting point is that we started with a massless equation but the exact solution describes a wave with a dispersion relation proper to a massive solution. When the mass term is not zero one gets

$$\varphi(x) = \pm\sqrt{\frac{2\mu^4}{\mu_0^2 + \sqrt{\mu_0^4 + 2\lambda\mu^4}}}{\rm sn}\left(p\cdot x+\theta,\sqrt{\frac{-\mu_0^2 + \sqrt{\mu_0^4 + 2\lambda\mu^4}}{-\mu_0^2 -
\sqrt{\mu_0^4 + 2\lambda\mu^4}}}\right)$$

being now the dispersion relation

$$p^2=\mu_0^2+\frac{\lambda\mu^4}{\mu_0^2+\sqrt{\mu_0^4+2\lambda\mu^4}}.$$

Finally, for the case of a symmetry breaking one has

$$\varphi(x) =\pm v\cdot {\rm dn}(p\cdot x+\theta,i),$$

being $v=\sqrt{\frac{2\mu_0^2}{3\lambda}}$ and the following dispersion relation holds

$$p^2=\frac{\lambda v^2}{2}.$$

These wave solutions are interesting as, notwithstanding we started with an equation with a wrong mass sign, the dispersion relation has the right one. Besides, the Jacobi function dn has no real zeros and so the field is never zero but moves around a given constant value that is initially chosen describing a spontaneous breaking of symmetry.

A proof of uniqueness can be provided if we note that the solution can be sought in the form $\varphi=\varphi(\xi)$ being $\xi=p\cdot x$. Then, the partial differential equation becomes an ordinary differential equation that is the one defining the Jacobi elliptic function with $p$ satisfying the proper dispersion relation.

== See also ==
- Scalar field theory
- Landau pole
- Renormalization
- Higgs mechanism
- Goldstone boson
- Coleman–Weinberg potential
