= Ladislas Goldstein =

Ladislas Goldstein (February 6, 1906 – July 15, 1994) was professor of electrical engineering at the University of Illinois (1951–72) and visiting professor of physics at the University of Paris-Orsay (1957–58, 1963–64, 1967–68). He was born in Dombrád, Kingdom of Hungary.

He received the BS degree from the College of the City of Nagyvárad, the MS degree from the University of Paris (1928), and a DSc in nuclear physics from the University of Paris (1937).

His research concentrated on the field of nuclear physics. He was notable for the application of gas-discharge phenomena in microwave physics, microwave propagation in free electron media, and infrared detection.

In 1956 he was elected to Fellow of the IEEE. He won the 1958 MTT prize.
