= Leonard M. Rieser =

American physicist (1922–1998)

- Born: Leonard Moos Rieser; May 18, 1922; Chicago, Illinois, U.S.
- Died: December 15, 1998 (aged 76); Lebanon, New Hampshire, U.S.
- Education: Dartmouth College; University of Chicago; Stanford University
- Spouse: Rosemary Littledale (m. 1944)
- Children: 4
- Scientific career
- Fields: Nuclear physics
- Workplaces: Metallurgical Laboratory; Los Alamos Laboratory; Dartmouth College
- Thesis: Reflection of X-rays from evaporated metal films (1951)

Leonard Moos Rieser (May 18, 1922 – December 15, 1998) was an American physicist who worked on the Manhattan Project and later for nuclear disarmament. Rieser was a professor of physics and provost at Dartmouth College.

== Biography ==
Rieser was born May 18, 1922, in Chicago. He studied at Dartmouth College from 1940 to 1942 before transferring to the University of Chicago and graduating with a bachelor's degree in physics in 1943. In 1942 he enlisted in the Army Signal Corps and after graduating from Chicago was assigned to work on the secret Manhattan Project, developing the atomic bomb. Rieser first worked at the Metallurgical Laboratory in Chicago, then at Los Alamos Laboratory in New Mexico where he witnessed the first atomic explosion. In 1944 he married Rosemary Littledale.

Rieser left the army and Los Alamos in 1946 to begin postgraduate studies at Stanford University, graduating with a PhD in 1952. That year he began teaching physics at Dartmouth College, where he worked until his retirement in 1992. He became an associate professor in 1957, and a professor in 1960. He held various administrative positions at the college, including provost and dean of the faculty.

Rieser served as president of the American Association for the Advancement of Science from 1972 to 1975. He was chair of the board of the Bulletin of the Atomic Scientists from 1985 to 1998. The Bulletin's Leonard M. Rieser Award for Young Authors bears his name. Starting in 1985, he was the keeper of the Bulletin's symbolic Doomsday Clock and moved its minute hand to indicate how close or far away we were from the threat of nuclear annihilation.

Rieser died December 15, 1998, from pancreatic cancer at the Dartmouth–Hitchcock Medical Center in Lebanon, New Hampshire, at the age of 76.

== Books ==
- Brown, Sanborn C.; Rieser, Leonard M. (1974). Natural Philosophy at Dartmouth: From Surveyors' Chains to the Pressure of Light. Hanover, N.H.: University Press of New England. ISBN 978-0-87451-102-4.
