= Laser ablation synthesis in solution =

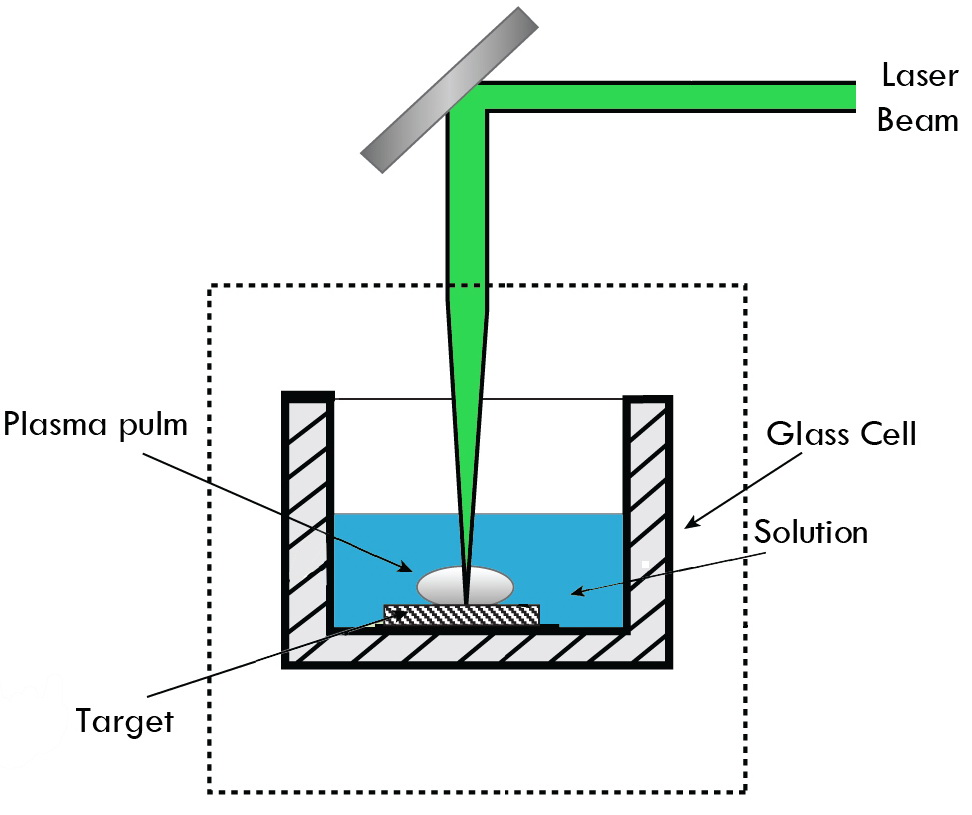
Preparation of nanoparticles by Laser in Solution

Laser ablation synthesis in solution (LASiS) is a commonly used method for obtaining colloidal solution of nanoparticles in a variety of solvents. Nanoparticles (NPs,), are useful in chemistry, engineering and biochemistry due to their large surface-to-volume ratio that causes them to have unique physical properties. LASiS is considered a "green" method due to its lack of use for toxic chemical precursors to synthesize nanoparticles.

In the LASiS method, nanoparticles are produced by a laser beam hitting a solid target in a liquid and during the condensation of the plasma plume, the nanoparticles are formed. Since the ablation is occurring in a liquid, versus air/vacuum/gas/, the environment allows for plume expansion, cooling and condensation with a higher temperature, pressure and density to create a plume with stronger confinement. These environmental conditions allow for more refined and smaller nanoparticles LASiS is usually considered a top-down physical approach. LASiS emerged as a reliable alternative to traditional chemical reduction methods for obtaining noble metal nanoparticles (NMNp). LASiS is also used for synthesis of silver nanoparticles AgNPs, which are known for their antimicrobial effects. Production of AgNPs via LASiS causes nanoparticles with varying antimicrobial characteristics due to different properties achieved via the fine tuning of NPs size in liquid ablation.

== Pros and Cons ==
LASiS has some limitations in the size control of NMNp, which can be overcome by laser treatments of NMNp. Other cons of LASiS include: the slow rate of NPs production, high consumption of energy, laser equipment cost, and decreased ablation efficiency with longer usage of the laser within a session. Other pros of LASiS include: minimal waste production, minimal manual operation, and refined size control of nanoparticles.
