= Lewis Salter =

American physicist

Lewis Salter (1926–1989) was an American theoretical physicist, physics professor, and researcher. He served as the dean of Knox College for 11 years and was the twelfth president of Wabash College.

== Biography ==
Salter was born in Norman, Oklahoma. He spent three years in the United States Army during World War II, then received his undergraduate education at the University of Oklahoma, where he was elected to Phi Beta Kappa. He was selected as a Rhodes Scholar, and spent 1949 to 1953 at the University of Oxford, where he received his master's degree and doctorate in theoretical physics.

After leaving Oxford, Salter joined the faculty of Wabash College in 1953. He took leave from Wabash from 1958 to 1960 to help establish a research program in theoretical physics at the Bandung Institute of Technology in Indonesia. He left Wabash in 1967 to become dean of Knox College He continued his international activities, working for the World Bank Survey team in Indonesia and consulting on science education there in 1972, and consulting on science education for the United States Agency for International Development. Salter was also a physics consultant to the Argonne National Laboratory and the Canadian National Research Council.

Salter returned to Wabash College as its president in 1978. The issue of Wabash remaining an all-male college was addressed multiple times while Salter was president.

After he was diagnosed with terminal cancer, he resigned the presidency of the college and returned to teaching physics in August 1989, but he died before the fall term ended. He continued to work on research problems until his death, and had a paper published posthumously in the American Journal of Physics.
