= Level-spacing distribution =

In mathematical physics, level spacing is the difference between consecutive elements in some set of real numbers. In particular, it is the difference between consecutive energy levels or eigenvalues of a matrix or linear operator.
