= Laser Mégajoule =

French fusion research project

Coordinates: 44°38′30.88″N 0°47′15.91″W

Laser Mégajoule (LMJ) is a large laser-based inertial confinement fusion (ICF) research device near Bordeaux, France, built by the French nuclear science directorate, Commissariat à l'Énergie Atomique (CEA).

Laser Mégajoule plans to deliver over 1 MJ of laser energy to its targets, compressing them to about 100 times the density of lead. It is about half as energetic as its US counterpart, the National Ignition Facility (NIF). Laser Mégajoule is the largest ICF experiment outside the US.

Laser Mégajoule's primary task will be refining fusion calculations for France's own nuclear weapons. A portion of the system's time is set aside for materials science experiments.

Construction of the LMJ took 15 years and cost 3 billion euros. It was declared operational on 23 October 2014, when it ran its first set of nuclear-weapon-related experiments.

== Description ==
Laser Mégajoule uses a series of 22 laser "beamlines". They are arranged into four separate "halls", two each side-by-side on either side of the experimental area in the center. Two of the halls have five lines, the other two have six.

Lasing starts in four optoelectronic lasers, one for each hall. The laser light from these sources is amplified in a series of 120 preamplifier modules (PAM), exiting the PAMs as a square beam about 40 by 40 millimetres (1.6 by 1.6 in). The system is arranged so that beams from the PAMs are sent into the amplifiers in groups of eight, arranged as two groups of four beams, a "quad", one quad above the other. This allows each amplifier line to produce eight separate beams. In contrast, NIF uses individual amplifiers for each of its 192 beams.

Each beamline contains two main glass amplifiers, which are optically pumped using xenon flashlamps. In order to extract more power from the amplifiers, which are not particularly efficient in transmitting power to the beam, the laser pulse is sent through the amplifiers twice by an optical switch in front of a mirror.

When the amplification is complete, the beams travel towards the "line end", closest to the target chamber in the center of the building. Each beam is reflected off a series of six mirrors to rearrange them from their parallel orientation in the beamlines to be arranged around the target chamber. The beams then travel through an optical frequency multiplier to boost the frequency into the ultraviolet. Finally, they are focused down to about 0.25 millimetres (0.0098 in) before entering the target chamber.

The experimental chamber consists of a 10-metre (33 ft) diameter sphere of 10-centimetre (3.9 in) thick aluminum, weighing around 140 metric tons. It is covered by a 40-centimetre (16 in) layer of borated concrete that forms a biological shield.

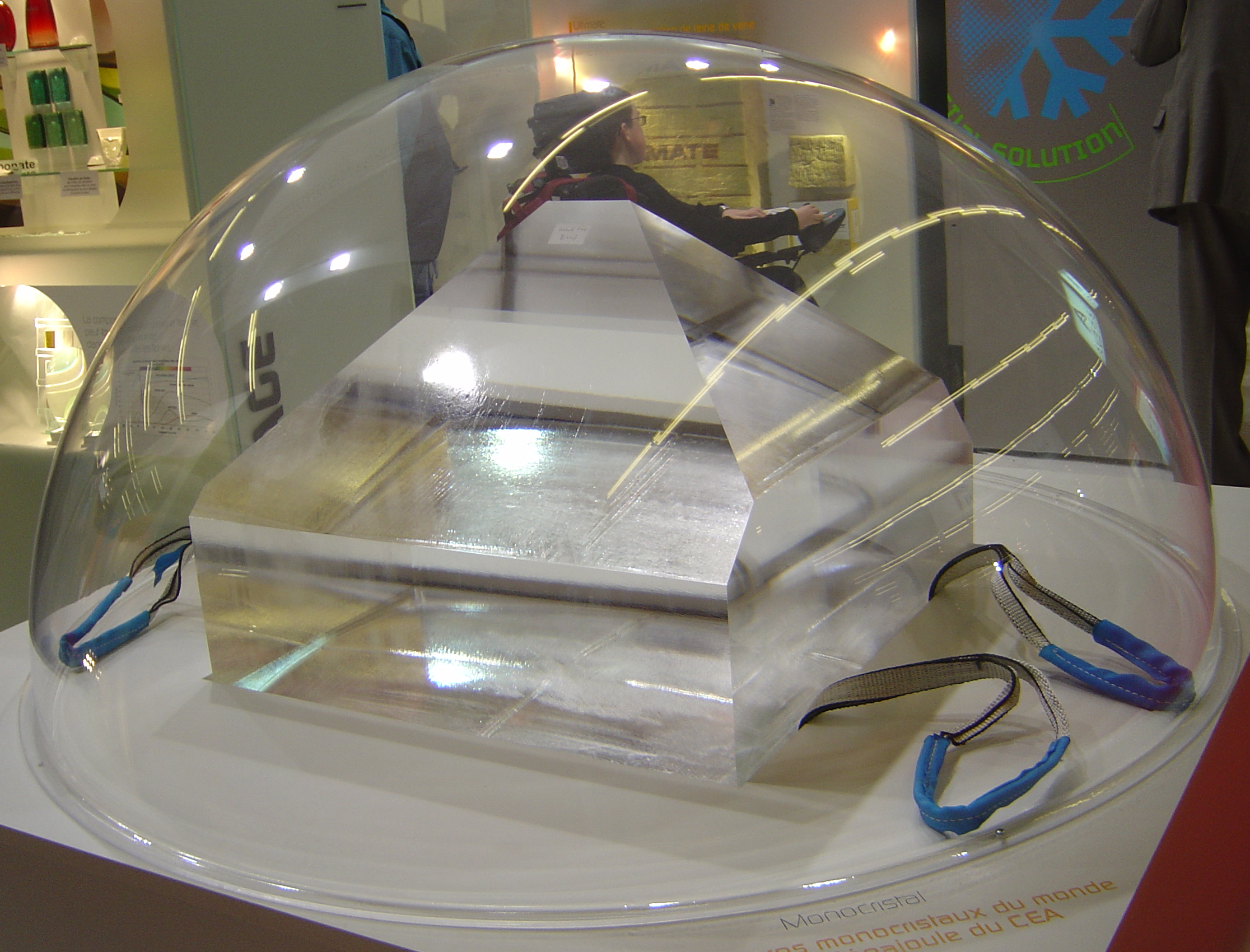
A huge monocrystal of potassium dihydrogen phosphate grown from solution by Saint-Gobain for frequency conversion on the LMJ.

== Experiments ==
Like NIF, LMJ intends to use the "indirect drive" approach, where the laser light is used to heat a high-Z cylinder made of some heavy metal (often gold) known as a "hohlraum". The hohlraum then gives off x-rays, which are used to heat a small fuel pellet containing a deuterium-tritium (DT) fusion fuel.

Although considerable laser energy is lost to heating the hohlraum, x-rays are much more efficient at heating the fuel pellet, making the indirect drive method applicable to nuclear weapons research. The x-rays heat the outer layer of the pellet so quickly that it explodes outward, causing the remainder of the pellet to be forced inward and causes a shock wave to travel in through the pellet to the middle. When the shock wave converges from all directions and meets in the middle, the density and temperature briefly reach the Lawson criterion and start fusion reactions. If the rate of reactions is high enough the heat generated by these reactions will cause surrounding fuel to fuse as well. This continues until the majority of the fuel in the pellet is consumed. This process is known as "ignition", and has long been a goal of fusion researchers.

== History ==
Construction on the Laser Mégajoule started with a single prototype beamline known as the Ligne d'Intégration Laser (Laser Integration Line), or LIL, powered by a 450 MJ energy bank. It was essentially a smaller version of the lines in the main design, with four beams instead of eight. It came online in 2002 and made 1,595 pulses and carried out 636 experiments before it shut down in February 2014. Its last experiment was carried out by LULI, Ecole Polytechnique and CELIA at the University of Bordeaux.

LMJ was delayed several times, but only for short periods. Designed to come into operation in early 2014, the schedule was pushed back to December, but ultimately pushed forward again to October.
