= Curved spacetime =

Mathematical theory of the geometry of space and time

In physics, curved spacetime is the mathematical model in which, with Einstein's theory of general relativity, gravity naturally arises, as opposed to being described as a fundamental force in Newton's static Euclidean reference frame. Objects move along geodesics—curved paths determined by the local geometry of spacetime—rather than being influenced directly by distant bodies. This framework led to two fundamental principles: coordinate independence, which asserts that the laws of physics are the same regardless of the coordinate system used, and the equivalence principle, which states that the effects of gravity are indistinguishable from those of acceleration in sufficiently small regions of space. These principles laid the groundwork for a deeper understanding of gravity through the geometry of spacetime, as formalized in Einstein's field equations.

== Introduction ==
Newton's theories assumed that motion takes place against the backdrop of a rigid Euclidean reference frame that extends throughout all space and all time. Gravity is mediated by a mysterious force, acting instantaneously across a distance, whose actions are independent of the intervening space. (Note: Newton himself was acutely aware of the inherent difficulties with these assumptions, but as a practical matter, making these assumptions was the only way that he could make progress. In 1692, he wrote to his friend Richard Bentley: "That Gravity should be innate, inherent and essential to Matter, so that one body may act upon another at a distance thro' a Vacuum, without the Mediation of any thing else, by and through which their Action and Force may be conveyed from one to another, is to me so great an Absurdity that I believe no Man who has in philosophical Matters a competent Faculty of thinking can ever fall into it.") In contrast, Einstein denied that there is any background Euclidean reference frame that extends throughout space. Nor is there any such thing as a force of gravitation, only the structure of spacetime itself.

Figure 1. Tidal effects.

In spacetime terms, the path of a satellite orbiting the Earth is not dictated by the distant influences of the Earth, Moon and Sun. Instead, the satellite moves through space only in response to local conditions. Since spacetime is everywhere locally flat when considered on a sufficiently small scale, the satellite is always following a straight line in its local inertial frame. We say that the satellite always follows along the path of a geodesic. No evidence of gravitation can be discovered following alongside the motions of a single particle.

In any analysis of spacetime, evidence of gravitation requires that one observe the relative accelerations of two bodies or two separated particles. In Fig. 1, two separated particles, free-falling in the gravitational field of the Earth, exhibit tidal accelerations due to local inhomogeneities in the gravitational field such that each particle follows a different path through spacetime. The tidal accelerations that these particles exhibit with respect to each other do not require forces for their explanation. Rather, Einstein described them in terms of the geometry of spacetime, i.e. the curvature of spacetime. These tidal accelerations are strictly local. It is the cumulative total effect of many local manifestations of curvature that result in the appearance of a gravitational force acting at a long range from Earth.

Different observers viewing the scenarios presented in this figure interpret the scenarios differently depending on their knowledge of the situation. (i) A first observer, at the center of mass of particles 2 and 3 but unaware of the large mass 1, concludes that a force of repulsion exists between the particles in scenario A while a force of attraction exists between the particles in scenario B. (ii) A second observer, aware of the large mass 1, smiles at the first reporter's naiveté. This second observer knows that in reality, the apparent forces between particles 2 and 3 really represent tidal effects resulting from their differential attraction by mass 1. (iii) A third observer, trained in general relativity, knows that there are, in fact, no forces at all acting between the three objects. Rather, all three objects move along geodesics in spacetime.

Two central propositions underlie general relativity.

- The first crucial concept is coordinate independence: The laws of physics cannot depend on what coordinate system one uses. This is a major extension of the principle of relativity from the version used in special relativity, which states that the laws of physics must be the same for every observer moving in non-accelerated (inertial) reference frames. In general relativity, to use Einstein's own (translated) words, "the laws of physics must be of such a nature that they apply to systems of reference in any kind of motion." This leads to an immediate issue: In accelerated frames, one feels forces that seemingly would enable one to assess one's state of acceleration in an absolute sense. Einstein resolved this problem through the principle of equivalence.

Figure 2. Equivalence principle

- The equivalence principle states that in any sufficiently small region of space, the effects of gravitation are the same as those from acceleration.
  In Fig. 2, person A is in a spaceship, far from any massive objects, that undergoes a uniform acceleration of g. Person B is in a box resting on Earth. Provided that the spaceship is sufficiently small so that tidal effects are non-measurable, there are no experiments that A and B can perform which will enable them to tell which setting they are in.
  An alternative expression of the equivalence principle is to note that in Newton's universal law of gravitation, F = GMm_{g}/r^{2} = m_{g}g and in Newton's second law, F = m_{i}a, there is no a priori reason why the gravitational mass m_{g} should be equal to the inertial mass m_{i}. The equivalence principle states that these two masses are identical.

To go from the elementary description above of curved spacetime to a complete description of gravitation requires tensor calculus and differential geometry, topics both requiring considerable study. Without these mathematical tools, it is possible to write about general relativity, but it is not possible to demonstrate any non-trivial derivations.

== What curvature means ==
=== The spacetime interval s^{2} ===
The "spacetime interval" (or "invariant interval") $s^2$ is used as an invariant "distance" between two events as measured by different observers.

It acquires additional importance in general relativity, since the form of this interval serves to characterize the geometric properties of the space (or spacetime) on which the interval has been defined. For example, in a Euclidean plane, the Pythagorean theorem holds for right triangles drawn in that plane. Conversely, if the distance between two points on a surface is given by the Pythagorean theorem, then that surface is necessarily a Euclidean plane.

=== Intrinsic curvature ===
In curved surfaces, the Pythagorean theorem generally does not hold in its ordinary Euclidean form. Intrinsic curvature can be determined entirely by measurements made within the surface itself, without reference to any higher-dimensional embedding.

Intrinsic curvature does not require a surface to be embedded in a higher-dimensional space. If a flat sheet is rolled into a cylinder or folded into complex origami forms without stretching, such deformations alter the sheet’s extrinsic curvature while leaving its intrinsic geometry unchanged. (Note: This is a consequence of Gauss's Theorema Egregium which in modern terms states that the Gaussian curvature of a surface is invariant under local isometry.)

In general relativity, spacetime curvature is treated intrinsically through measurements made entirely within spacetime itself of such effects as geodesic deviation and tidal effects (described above in the Introduction).

=== Curvature versus coordinates ===
Cartesian coordinates

Polar coordinates

Oblique coordinates

Spherical coordinates

Figure 3. Computing ds in different coordinate systems

In relativistic calculations, one often chooses coordinate systems that simplify the computations. The expression for the Pythagorean theorem, and hence the spacetime interval, depends both on the geometry of spacetime and on the coordinate system used to describe it. For example, in Fig. 3, we see for the following coordinate systems:

- (a) Euclidean: $ds^2 = dx^2 + dy^2$
- (b) Polar: $ds^2 = dr^2 + r^2 d\theta^2$
- (c) Oblique: $ds^2 = dx^2 + dy^2 -$ $2 dx \, dy \, \cos \alpha$
- (d) Spherical: $ds^2 = r^2 d\alpha^2 + R^2 d\beta^2$

In cases (a), (b), and (c), the surfaces are flat. In case (d), the surface is spherical.

The expression for $ds^2$ hence depends on both the intrinsic properties of the surface and the coordinate system used to describe that surface. A cursory examination of $ds^2$ will not suffice to determine the characteristics of the surface that we are dealing with, since the appearance of the metric coefficients alone does not determine whether a space is intrinsically curved. Complicated coefficients may arise merely from the choice of coordinates. Additional mathematical quantities are needed to distinguish genuine curvature from coordinate artifacts.

One such quantity is the Christoffel symbol, which describes how coordinate grids change from point to point. Christoffel symbols may become nonzero even in flat space when curvilinear coordinates are used. They therefore do not by themselves represent intrinsic curvature.

Intrinsic curvature is instead characterized by the Riemann curvature tensor. In flat spaces, the components of the curvature tensor vanish even when the metric coefficients and Christoffel symbols are complicated. Nonzero curvature tensor components indicate genuine curvature that cannot be eliminated by a change of coordinates.

=== Local flatness and inertial frames ===
Spacetime in general relativity is generally curved because of gravity. Nevertheless, every sufficiently small region of spacetime approximates flat Minkowski spacetime. Within such a small region, the laws of physics reduce to those of special relativity.

Mathematical quantities called Christoffel symbols describe how coordinate systems change from point to point. These quantities may be interpreted as representing local gravitational and inertial effects. Einstein's thought experiment of the falling painter illustrates that one can always choose a freely falling frame in which such local effects disappear. Mathematically, one can always choose coordinates in a sufficiently small region of spacetime such that the Christoffel symbols vanish at a point.

Spacetime curvature, however, represents an intrinsic geometric property of spacetime associated with tidal effects and geodesic deviation. Unlike Christoffel symbols, curvature cannot generally be transformed away even locally by a change of coordinates. Even in a freely falling frame where local gravitational effects disappear, nearby freely falling particles may still accelerate relative to one another because of spacetime curvature.

Thus, the equivalence principle states that gravity can always be locally transformed away in a sufficiently small freely falling frame, while spacetime curvature remains as the underlying geometric property of spacetime.

== Newtonian gravity and gravitational time dilation ==
Figure 4. Einstein's argument suggesting gravitational redshift

In the discussion of special relativity, forces played no more than a background role. Special relativity assumes the ability to define inertial frames that fill all of spacetime, all of whose clocks run at the same rate as the clock at the origin. Is this really possible? In a nonuniform gravitational field, experiment dictates that the answer is no. Gravitational fields make it impossible to construct a global inertial frame. In small enough regions of spacetime, local inertial frames are still possible. General relativity involves the systematic stitching together of these local frames into a more general picture of spacetime.

Years before publication of the general theory in 1916, Einstein used the equivalence principle to predict the existence of gravitational redshift in the following thought experiment: (i) Assume that a tower of height h (Fig. 4) has been constructed. (ii) Drop a particle of rest mass m from the top of the tower. It falls freely with acceleration g, reaching the ground with velocity v = (2gh)^{1/2}, so that its total energy E, as measured by an observer on the ground, is $m + {\tfrac{1}{2} m v^2} / {c^2} = m + {m g h} / {c^2}$ (iii) A mass-energy converter transforms the total energy of the particle into a single high energy photon, which it directs upward. (iv) At the top of the tower, an energy-mass converter transforms the energy of the photon E' back into a particle of rest mass m'.

It must be that m = m', since otherwise one would be able to construct a perpetual motion device. We therefore predict that E' = m, so that

$$\frac{E'}{E} = \frac{h \nu \, '}{ h \nu} = \frac{m}{m + \frac{mgh}{c^2}} = 1 - \frac{gh}{c^2}$$

A photon climbing in Earth's gravitational field loses energy and is redshifted. Early attempts to measure this redshift through astronomical observations were somewhat inconclusive, but definitive laboratory observations were performed by Pound & Rebka (1959) and later by Pound & Snider (1964).

Light has an associated frequency, and this frequency may be used to drive the workings of a clock. The gravitational redshift leads to an important conclusion about time itself: Gravity makes time run slower. Suppose we build two identical clocks whose rates are controlled by some stable atomic transition. Place one clock on top of the tower, while the other clock remains on the ground. An experimenter on top of the tower observes that signals from the ground clock are lower in frequency than those of the clock next to her on the tower. Light going up the tower is just a wave, and it is impossible for wave crests to disappear on the way up. Exactly as many oscillations of light arrive at the top of the tower as were emitted at the bottom. The experimenter concludes that the ground clock is running slow, and can confirm this by bringing the tower clock down to compare side by side with the ground clock. For a 1 km tower, the discrepancy would amount to about 9.4 nanoseconds per day, easily measurable with modern instrumentation.

Clocks in a gravitational field do not all run at the same rate. Experiments such as the Pound–Rebka experiment have firmly established the distortion of the time component of spacetime. The Pound–Rebka experiment says nothing about curvature of the space component of spacetime. But the theoretical arguments predicting gravitational time dilation do not depend on the details of general relativity at all. Any theory of gravity will predict gravitational time dilation if it respects the principle of equivalence. This includes Newtonian gravitation. A standard demonstration in general relativity is to show how, in the "Newtonian limit" (i.e. the particles are moving slowly, the gravitational field is weak, and the field is static), Newton's law of gravity may be derived from the time component alone of the Christoffel symbols describing the geometry of spacetime.

Newtonian gravitation can thus be described informally as a "curvature of time", although strictly speaking, "curvature" is a property of spacetime as a whole rather than of time alone. (Note: In general relativity, gravity is identified with the curvature of spacetime, a coordinate-independent property described by the curvature tensors of the metric. In the weak-field limit, gravitational effects are largely governed by distortions of the time component of the metric, producing gravitational time dilation. While in pedagogical contexts, this is sometimes loosely referred to as a "curvature of time", the term is not used in a precise geometric sense; more accurately, it reflects a change (or distortion) of the metric structure, rather than curvature of a one-dimensional time manifold.) General relativity, on the other hand, is a theory of curved spacetime. Given G as the gravitational constant, M as the mass of a Newtonian star, and orbiting bodies of insignificant mass at distance r from the star, the spacetime interval for Newtonian gravitation is one for which only the time coefficient is variable:

$$\Delta s^2 = \left( 1 - \frac{2GM}{c^2 r} \right) (c \Delta t)^2 - \, (\Delta x)^2 - (\Delta y)^2 - (\Delta z)^2$$

== Curvature of spacetime ==
The $(1 - 2GM/(c^2 r) )$ coefficient in front of $(c \Delta t)^2$ describes the curvature of time in Newtonian gravitation, and this curvature completely accounts for all Newtonian gravitational effects. As expected, this correction factor is directly proportional to $G$ and $M$, and because of the $r$ in the denominator, the correction factor increases as one approaches the gravitating body, meaning that time is increasingly curved.

But general relativity is a theory of curved space and curved time, so if there are terms modifying the spatial components of the spacetime interval presented above, should not their effects be seen on, say, planetary and satellite orbits due to curvature correction factors applied to the spatial terms?

The answer is that they are seen, but the effects are tiny. The reason is that planetary velocities are extremely small compared to the speed of light, so that for planets and satellites of the Solar System, the $(c \Delta t)^2$ term dwarfs the spatial terms.

Despite the minuteness of the spatial terms, the first indications that something was wrong with Newtonian gravitation were discovered over a century-and-a-half ago. In 1859, Urbain Le Verrier, in an analysis of available timed observations of transits of Mercury over the Sun's disk from 1697 to 1848, reported that known physics could not explain the orbit of Mercury, unless there possibly existed a planet or asteroid belt within the orbit of Mercury. The perihelion of Mercury's orbit exhibited an excess rate of precession over that which could be explained by the tugs of the other planets. The ability to detect and accurately measure the minute value of this anomalous precession (only 43 arc seconds per tropical century) is testimony to the sophistication of 19th century astrometry.

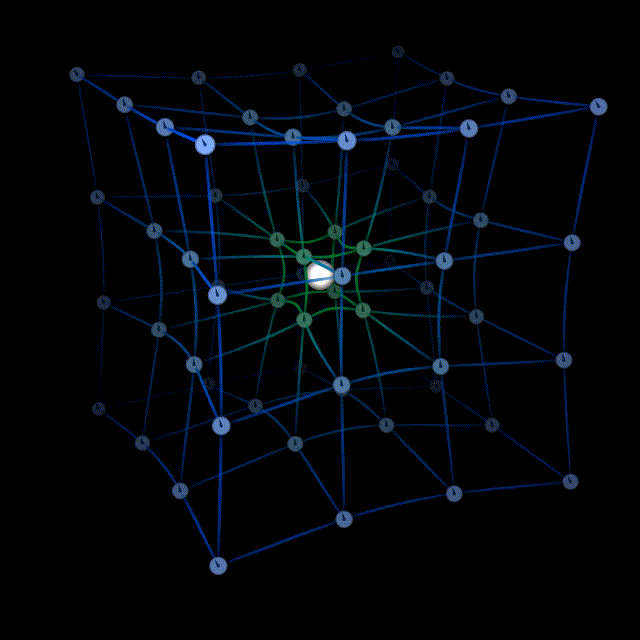
Figure 5. General relativity is a theory of curved time and curved space. Click here to animate.

As the astronomer who had earlier discovered the existence of Neptune "at the tip of his pen" by analyzing irregularities in the orbit of Uranus, Le Verrier's announcement triggered a two-decades long period of "Vulcan-mania", as professional and amateur astronomers alike hunted for the hypothetical new planet. This search included several false sightings of Vulcan. It was ultimately established that no such planet or asteroid belt existed.

In 1916, Einstein was to show that this anomalous precession of Mercury is explained by the spatial terms in the curvature of spacetime. Curvature in the temporal term, being simply an expression of Newtonian gravitation, has no part in explaining this anomalous precession. The success of his calculation was a powerful indication to Einstein's peers that the general theory of relativity could be correct.

The most spectacular of Einstein's predictions was his calculation that the curvature terms in the spatial components of the spacetime interval could be measured in the bending of light around a massive body. Light has a slope of ±1 on a spacetime diagram. Its movement in space is equal to its movement in time. For the weak field expression of the invariant interval, Einstein calculated an exactly equal but opposite sign curvature in its spatial components.

$\Delta s^2 = \left( 1 - \frac{2GM}{c^2 r} \right) (c \Delta t)^2$$- \, \left( 1 + \frac{2GM}{c^2 r} \right) \left[ (\Delta x)^2 + (\Delta y)^2 + (\Delta z)^2 \right]$

In Newton's gravitation, the $(1 - 2GM/(c^2 r) )$ coefficient in front of $(c \Delta t)^2$ predicts bending of light around a star. In general relativity, the $(1 + 2GM/(c^2 r) )$ coefficient in front of $\left[ (\Delta x)^2 + (\Delta y)^2 + (\Delta z)^2 \right]$ predicts a doubling of the total bending.

The story of the 1919 Eddington eclipse expedition and Einstein's rise to fame is well told elsewhere.

== Sources of spacetime curvature ==
Figure 6. Contravariant components of the stress–energy tensor

In Newton's theory of gravitation, the only source of gravitational force is mass.

In contrast, general relativity identifies several sources of spacetime curvature in addition to mass. In the Einstein field equations, the sources of gravity are presented on the right-hand side in $T_{\mu \nu},$ the stress–energy tensor.

Fig. 6 classifies the various sources of gravity in the stress–energy tensor:

- $T^{00}$ (red): The total mass–energy density, including any contributions to the potential energy from forces between the particles, as well as kinetic energy from random thermal motions.
- $T^{0i}$ and $T^{i0}$ (orange): These are momentum density terms. Even if there is no bulk motion, energy may be transmitted by heat conduction, and the conducted energy will carry momentum.
- $T^{ij}$ are the rates of flow of the i-component of momentum per unit area in the j-direction. Even if there is no bulk motion, random thermal motions of the particles will give rise to momentum flow, so the i = j terms (green) represent isotropic pressure, and the i ≠ j terms (blue) represent shear stresses.

One important conclusion to be derived from the equations is that, colloquially speaking, gravity itself creates gravity. (Note: More precisely, the gravitational field couples to itself. In Newtonian gravity, the potential due to two point masses is simply the sum of the potentials of the two masses, but this does not apply to GR. This can be thought of as the result of the equivalence principle: If gravitation did not couple to itself, two particles bound by their mutual gravitational attraction would not have the same inertial mass (due to negative binding energy) as their gravitational mass.) Energy has mass. Even in Newtonian gravity, the gravitational field is associated with an energy, $E = mgh,$ called the gravitational potential energy. In general relativity, the energy of the gravitational field feeds back into creation of the gravitational field. This makes the equations nonlinear and hard to solve in anything other than weak field cases. Numerical relativity is a branch of general relativity using numerical methods to solve and analyze problems, often employing supercomputers to study black holes, gravitational waves, neutron stars and other phenomena in the strong field regime.

=== Energy-momentum ===
Figure 7. (left) Mass-energy warps spacetime. (right) Rotating mass–energy distributions with angular momentum J generate gravitomagnetic fields H.

In special relativity, mass-energy is closely connected to momentum. Just as space and time are different aspects of a more comprehensive entity called spacetime, mass–energy and momentum are merely different aspects of a unified, four-dimensional quantity called four-momentum. In consequence, if mass–energy is a source of gravity, momentum must also be a source. The inclusion of momentum as a source of gravity leads to the prediction that moving or rotating masses can generate fields analogous to the magnetic fields generated by moving charges, a phenomenon known as gravitomagnetism.

Figure 8. Origin of gravitomagnetism

It is well known that the force of magnetism can be deduced by applying the rules of special relativity to moving charges. (An eloquent demonstration of this was presented by Feynman in volume II, chapter 13–6 of his Lectures on Physics, available online.) Analogous logic can be used to demonstrate the origin of gravitomagnetism.

In Fig. 8a, two parallel, infinitely long streams of massive particles have equal and opposite velocities −v and +v relative to a test particle at rest and centered between the two. Because of the symmetry of the setup, the net force on the central particle is zero. Assume $v \ll c$ so that velocities are simply additive. Fig. 8b shows exactly the same setup, but in the frame of the upper stream. The test particle has a velocity of +v, and the bottom stream has a velocity of +2v. Since the physical situation has not changed, only the frame in which things are observed, the test particle should not be attracted towards either stream.

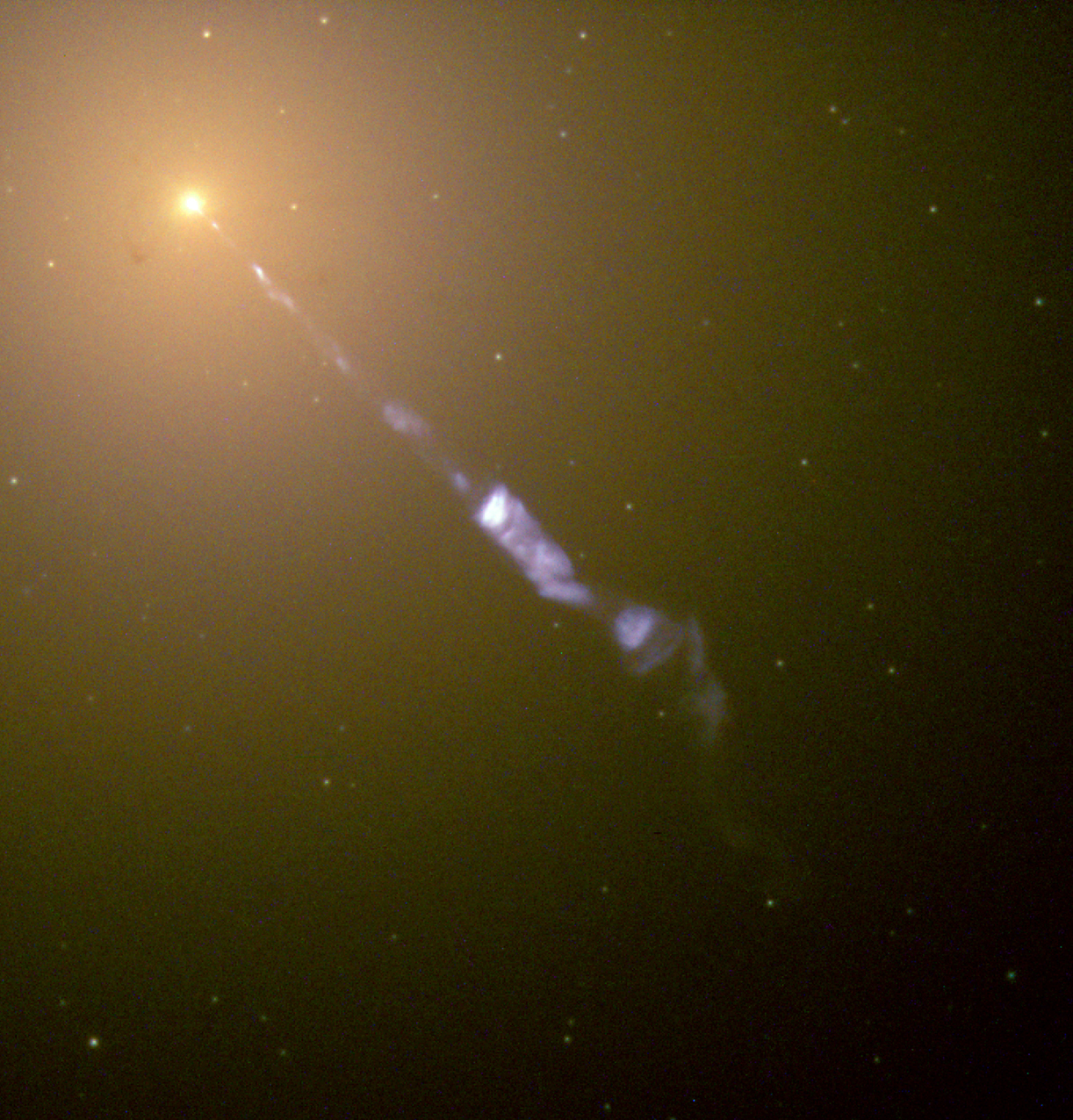
Fig. 9. Elliptical galaxy M87 emitting a relativistic jet, as seen by the Hubble Space Telescope

It is not at all clear that the forces exerted on the test particle are equal. (1) Since the bottom stream is moving faster than the top, each particle in the bottom stream has a larger mass energy than a particle in the top. (2) Because of Lorentz contraction, there are more particles per unit length in the bottom stream than in the top stream. (3) Another contribution to the active gravitational mass of the bottom stream comes from an additional pressure term which, at this point, we do not have sufficient background to discuss. All of these effects together would seemingly demand that the test particle be drawn towards the bottom stream.

The test particle is not drawn to the bottom stream because of a velocity-dependent force that serves to repel a particle that is moving in the same direction as the bottom stream. This velocity-dependent gravitational effect is gravitomagnetism.

Matter in motion through a gravitomagnetic field is hence subject to so-called frame-dragging effects analogous to electromagnetic induction. It has been proposed that such gravitomagnetic forces underlie the generation of the relativistic jets (Fig. 9) ejected by some rotating supermassive black holes.

=== Pressure and stress ===
Quantities that are directly related to energy and momentum should be sources of gravity as well, namely internal pressure and stress. Taken together, mass-energy, momentum, pressure and stress all serve as sources of gravity: Collectively, they are what tells spacetime how to curve.

General relativity predicts that pressure acts as a gravitational source with exactly the same strength as mass–energy density. The inclusion of pressure as a source of gravity leads to dramatic differences between the predictions of general relativity versus those of Newtonian gravitation. For example, the pressure term sets a maximum limit to the mass of a neutron star. The more massive a neutron star, the more pressure is required to support its weight against gravity. The increased pressure, however, adds to the gravity acting on the star's mass. Above a certain mass determined by the Tolman–Oppenheimer–Volkoff limit, the process becomes runaway and the neutron star collapses to a black hole.

The stress terms become highly significant when performing calculations such as hydrodynamic simulations of core-collapse supernovae.

These predictions for the roles of pressure, momentum and stress as sources of spacetime curvature are elegant and play an important role in theory. In regards to pressure, the early universe was radiation dominated, and it is highly unlikely that any of the relevant cosmological data (e.g. nucleosynthesis abundances, etc.) could be reproduced if pressure did not contribute to gravity, or if it did not have the same strength as a source of gravity as mass–energy. Likewise, the mathematical consistency of the Einstein field equations would be broken if the stress terms did not contribute as a source of gravity.

== Experimental test of the sources of spacetime curvature ==
=== Definitions: Active, passive, and inertial mass ===
Bondi distinguishes between different possible types of mass: (1) active mass ($m_a$) is the mass which acts as the source of a gravitational field; (2)passive mass ($m_p$) is the mass which reacts to a gravitational field; (3) inertial mass ($m_i$) is the mass which reacts to acceleration.

- $m_p$ is the same as gravitational mass ($m_g$) in the discussion of the equivalence principle.

In Newtonian theory,

- The third law of action and reaction dictates that $m_a$ and $m_p$ must be the same.
- On the other hand, whether $m_p$ and $m_i$ are equal is an empirical result.

In general relativity,

- The equality of $m_p$ and $m_i$ is dictated by the equivalence principle.
- There is no "action and reaction" principle dictating any necessary relationship between $m_a$ and $m_p$.

=== Pressure as a gravitational source ===
Figure 10. (A) Cavendish experiment, (B) Kreuzer experiment

The classic experiment to measure the strength of a gravitational source (i.e. its active mass) was first conducted in 1797 by Henry Cavendish (Fig. 10a). Two small but dense balls are suspended on a fine wire, making a torsion balance. Bringing two large test masses close to the balls introduces a detectable torque. Given the dimensions of the apparatus and the measurable spring constant of the torsion wire, the gravitational constant G can be determined.

To study pressure effects by compressing the test masses is hopeless, because attainable laboratory pressures are insignificant in comparison with the mass-energy of a metal ball.

However, the repulsive electromagnetic pressures resulting from protons being tightly squeezed inside atomic nuclei are typically on the order of 10^{28} atm ≈ 10^{33} Pa ≈ 10^{33} kg·s^{−2}m^{−1}. This amounts to about 1% of the nuclear mass density of approximately 10^{18}kg/m^{3} (after factoring in c^{2} ≈ 9×10^{16}m^{2}s^{−2}).

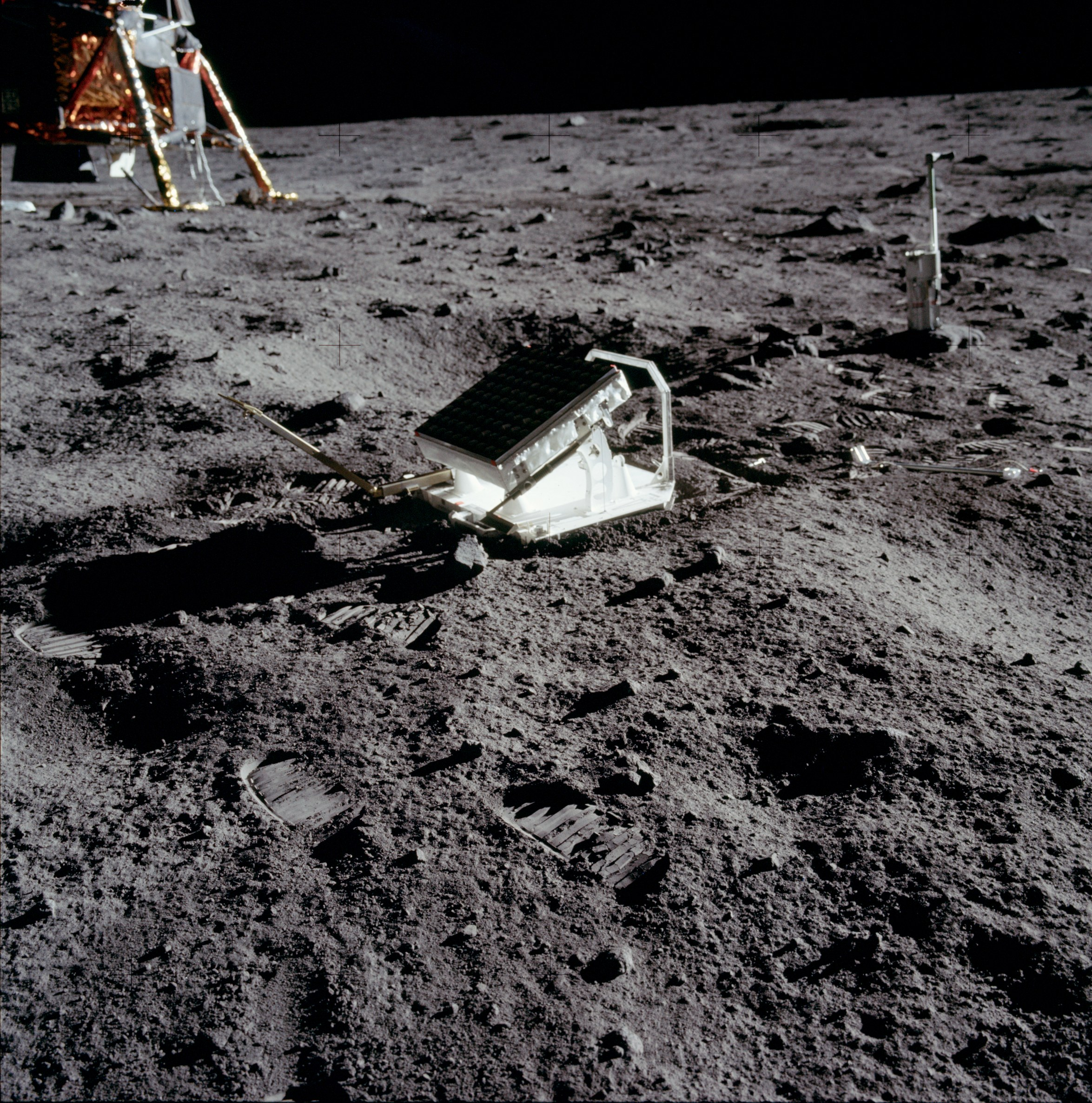
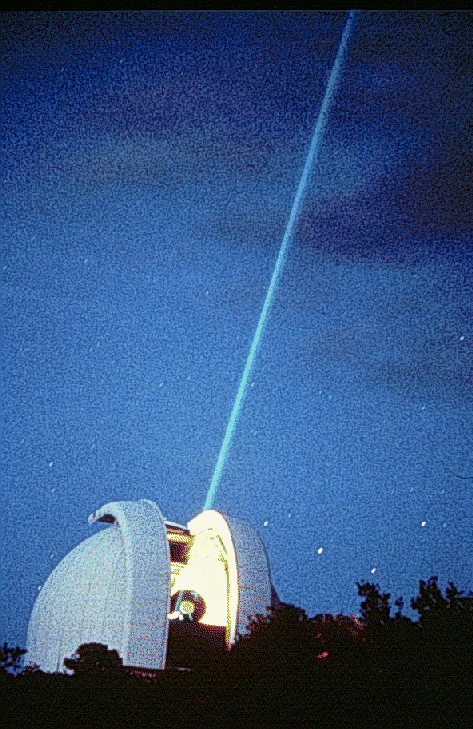
Figure 11. Lunar laser ranging experiment. (left) This retroreflector was left on the Moon by astronauts on the Apollo 11 mission. (right) Astronomers all over the world have bounced laser light off the retroreflectors left by Apollo astronauts and Russian lunar rovers to measure precisely the Earth-Moon distance.

If pressure does not act as a gravitational source, then the ratio $m_a/m_p$ should be lower for nuclei with higher atomic number Z, in which the electrostatic pressures are higher. L. B. Kreuzer (1968) did a Cavendish experiment using a Teflon mass suspended in a mixture of the liquids trichloroethylene and dibromoethane having the same buoyant density as the Teflon (Fig. 10b). Fluorine has atomic number Z = 9, while bromine has Z = 35. Kreuzer found that repositioning the Teflon mass caused no differential deflection of the torsion bar, hence establishing active mass and passive mass to be equivalent to a precision of 5×10^{−5}.

Although Kreuzer originally considered this experiment merely to be a test of the ratio of active mass to passive mass, Clifford Will (1976) reinterpreted the experiment as a fundamental test of the coupling of sources to gravitational fields.

In 1986, Bartlett and Van Buren noted that lunar laser ranging had detected a 2 km offset between the moon's center of figure and its center of mass. This indicates an asymmetry in the distribution of Fe (abundant in the Moon's core) and Al (abundant in its crust and mantle). If pressure did not contribute equally to spacetime curvature as does mass–energy, the moon would not be in the orbit predicted by classical mechanics. They used their measurements to tighten the limits on any discrepancies between active and passive mass to about 10^{−12}. With decades of additional lunar laser ranging data, Singh et al. (2023) reported improvement on these limits by a factor of about 100.

=== Gravitomagnetism ===
Figure 11. Gravity Probe B confirmed the existence of gravitomagnetism

The existence of gravitomagnetism was proven by Gravity Probe B (GP-B), a satellite-based mission which launched on 20 April 2004. The spaceflight phase lasted until 2005. The mission aim was to measure spacetime curvature near Earth, with particular emphasis on gravitomagnetism.

Initial results confirmed the relatively large geodetic effect (which is due to simple spacetime curvature, and is also known as de Sitter precession) to an accuracy of about 1%. The much smaller frame-dragging effect (which is due to gravitomagnetism, and is also known as Lense–Thirring precession) was difficult to measure because of unexpected charge effects causing variable drift in the gyroscopes. Nevertheless, by August 2008, the frame-dragging effect had been confirmed to within 15% of the expected result, while the geodetic effect was confirmed to better than 0.5%.

Subsequent measurements of frame dragging by laser-ranging observations of the LARES, LAGEOS-1 and LAGEOS-2 satellites has improved on the GP-B measurement, with results (as of 2016) demonstrating the effect to within 5% of its theoretical value, although there has been some disagreement on the accuracy of this result.

Another effort, the Gyroscopes in General Relativity (GINGER) experiment, seeks to use three 6 m ring lasers mounted at right angles to each other 1400 m below the Earth's surface to measure this effect. The first ten years of experience with a prototype ring laser gyroscope array, GINGERINO, established that the full scale experiment should be able to measure gravitomagnetism due to the Earth's rotation to within a 0.1% level or even better.

== See also ==
- Spacetime topology
