= Light-dragging effects =

Pre-relativistic physical theory

In 19th century physics, there were several situations in which the motion of matter might be said to drag light. This aether drag hypothesis was an attempt by classical physics to explain stellar aberration and the Fizeau experiment, but was discarded when Albert Einstein introduced his theory of relativity. Despite this, the expression light-dragging has remained in use somewhat, as discussed on this page.

Under special relativity's simplified model Einstein assumes that light-dragging effects do not occur, and that the speed of light is independent of the speed of the emitting body's motion. However, the special theory of relativity does not deal with particulate matter effects or gravitational effects, nor does it provide a complete relativistic description of acceleration. When more realistic assumptions are made (that real objects are composed of particulate matter, and have gravitational properties), under general relativity's more sophisticated model the resulting descriptions include light-dragging effects.

Einstein's theory of special relativity provides the solution to the Fizeau Experiment, which demonstrates the effect termed Fresnel drag whereby the velocity of light is modified by travelling through a moving medium. Einstein showed how the velocity of light in a moving medium is calculated, in the velocity-addition formula of special relativity.

Einstein's theory of general relativity provides the solution to the other light-dragging effects, whereby the velocity of light is modified by the motion or the rotation of nearby masses. These effects all have one property in common: they are all velocity-dependent effects, whether that velocity be straight-line motion (causing frame-dragging) or rotational motion (causing rotation-dragging).

== Velocity-dependent effects ==
Special relativity predicts that the velocity of light is modified by travelling through a moving medium.

- For a moving particulate body, light moving through the body's structure is known to move faster in the direction of the body's motion than it does in the opposite direction (Fizeau experiment). This effect was originally predicted by dragged-aether theories (see: e.g. Fresnel). Light aimed transversely through a moving transparent body is also seen to be translated in the direction of the body's motion (R.V. Jones, J.Phys A 4 L1-L3 (1971) ).

General relativity predicts that the acceleration of a body in a straight line will cause light to drag, an effect known as Frame dragging (or gravitoelectromagnetism).

- For a moving gravity-source the gravitational field can be considered as an extension of the object, and carries inertia and momentum - since a direct collision with the moving object can impart momentum to an external particle, interaction with the object's gravitational field should allow "momentum exchange" too. Consequently, a moving gravitational field drags light and matter. This general effect is used by NASA to accelerate space probes, using the gravitational slingshot effect.

== Rotation-dragging effects ==
Under general relativity, the rotation of a body gives it an additional gravitational attraction due to its kinetic energy; and light is pulled around (to some degree) by the rotation (Lense–Thirring effect).

- In the case of rotation, under general relativity we observe a velocity-dependent dragging effect, since, for a rotating body, the tendency of the object to pull things around with it can be accounted for by the fact that the receding part of the object is pulling more strongly than the approaching part.

== See also ==
- Aether drag
- Democratic principle
- Einstein–Infeld–Hoffmann equations
