= Precession (disambiguation) =

Precession refers to a specific change in the direction of the rotation axis of a rotating object, in which the second Euler angle (angle of nutation) is constant

Precession may refer to:

- Precession, one of the Euler rotations
- Precession (mechanical), the process of one part rotating with respect to another due to fretting between the two
- Larmor precession, the precession of the magnetic moments of electrons, atomic nuclei, and atoms about an external magnetic field
- Astronomical precession
  - Axial precession or precession of the equinoxes, the precession of the Earth's axis of rotation
  - Apsidal precession, the rotation of the orbit of a celestial body
  - Nodal precession, the precession of the orbital plane of a satellite around the rotational axis of an astronomical body due to the non-spherical nature of it.
  - List of gravitationally rounded objects of the Solar System#Planets. our solar system's planetary precession timeperiods
- Relativistic Precession (disambiguation)
  - Thomas precession, a special relativistic correction to the precession of a gyroscope in a rotating non-inertial frame
  - de Sitter precession, a general relativistic correction to the precession of a gyroscope near a large mass such as the Earth
  - Lense–Thirring precession, a general relativistic correction to the precession of a gyroscope near a large rotating mass such as the Earth
- Phase precession, a pattern of neuronal firing in relation to local neuron populations

== See also ==
- Axial tilt, the inclination angle of a planet's rotational axis in relation to a perpendicular to its orbital plane
- Conventional International Origin, a conventionally defined reference axis of the pole's average location over the year 1900
- Great year, the time required for one complete cycle of the precession of the equinoxes
- Nutation, a slight irregular motion (etymologically a "nodding") in the axis of rotation of a largely axially symmetric object
- Polar motion, the movement of Earth's rotation axis across its surface
