= Coriolis field =

Apparent gravitational field

In theoretical physics a Coriolis field is one of the apparent gravitational fields felt by a rotating or forcibly-accelerated body, together with the centrifugal field and the Euler field.

== Mathematical expression ==
Let $\vec\omega$ be the angular velocity vector of the rotating frame, $\vec v$ be the speed of a test particle used to measure the field. Hence, using the expression of the acceleration in a rotating reference frame, it is known that the acceleration of the particle in the rotating frame is:

$$\mathbf{a}_{\mathrm{r}} =
\mathbf{a}_{\mathrm{i}} -
2 \boldsymbol\omega \times \mathbf{v} -
\boldsymbol\omega \times (\boldsymbol\omega \times \mathbf{r}) -
\frac{d\boldsymbol\omega}{dt} \times \mathbf{r}$$

the Coriolis force is assumed to be the fictitious force that compensates the second term:

$$\mathbf{F}_{\mathrm{Coriolis}} =
-2m ( \boldsymbol\omega \times \mathbf{v}) =
-2 ( \boldsymbol\omega \times \mathbf{p})$$

Where $\vec p$ denotes the linear momentum. It can be seen that for any object, the coriolis force over it is proportional to its momentum vector. As a vector product, it can be expressed in a tensorial way using the Hodge dual of $\omega$:

$$\mathbf{F}_{\mathrm{Coriolis}} =
-2(\mathbf{\omega} \times \mathbf{p}) = -2(\mathbf{\omega} \times) \mathbf{p} = \begin{bmatrix}\,0&\!-2\omega_3&\,\,2\omega_2\\ \,\,2\omega_3&0&\!-2\omega_1\\-2\omega_2&\,\,2\omega_1&\,0\end{bmatrix}\begin{bmatrix}p_1\\p_2\\p_3\end{bmatrix}$$

This matrix can be seen as a constant tensor field, defined in the whole space, that will yield coriolis forces when multiplied by momentum vectors.

== Mach's view ==
In a theory that conforms to some versions of Mach's principle, this “apparent”, “fictitious” or “pseudo-gravitational” field effect can be treated as genuine.

As an example, when an object is set down on a rotating children's roundabout, it is seen to slide away from the centre of the roundabout. In the non-rotating frame of reference, the outward motion is a consequence of the object's inertial mass and the object's tendency to continue moving in a straight line. However, in the rotating frame as a reference, the object is pulled outwards by a radial gravitational field caused by the relative rotation of the outside universe. In that view, the (outward) motion is instead a consequence of its gravitational mass.

This dual description is used to unify the ideas of inertial and gravitational mass under general theories of relativity, and to explain why an object's inertial mass and gravitational mass are proportional in classical theory. In these descriptions, the distinction is purely a matter of convenience; inertial and gravitational mass are different ways of describing the same behaviour.

=== Is it real? ===
Support for the idea that the Coriolis field is a real physical effect and not just a mathematical artifact is justified by Machian theory. It notes that evidence of the field's existence is not only visible to the rotating observer; its distortion is also visible and verifiable for non-rotating onlookers. Thus, the relative rotation of the roundabout and universe masses creates a real physical distortion in spacetime that is visible to all observers (see: Kerr black hole, frame-dragging, light-dragging effects). The physical consequences of rotation experienced by the rotating-frame observer can be said to be “smudged into” the non-rotating observer's physics. The Coriolis field can thus be said to have a genuine existence; it is expressed in the intrinsic curvature of the region and cannot be made to vanish with a convenient mathematical change of coordinate system. The forces and effects are mutual–the roundabout observer feels the outside universe pulling more strongly along the rotation plane, and pulling matter around, and (to a far lesser extent) the mass of the rotating roundabout creates a stronger inward pull and pulls matter around with it as well.

In this way, general theories of relativity are supposed to also eliminate the strict distinction between inertial and noninertial frames. If we take an inertial observer in flat spacetime and have them observe a rotating disc, the existence of the rotating mass means that spacetime is no longer flat, and that the concept of rotation is now subject to the democratic principle.

This elimination of the concept of the inertial frame was initially described by Einstein as one of the great successes of his general theory of relativity.

== See also ==
- Classical theories of gravitation
- Coriolis effect
- Equivalence principle
- General relativity
- Gravitomagnetism
- Mach's principle
- Newton's bucket
