= Relativistic Precession =

The special and general theories of relativity give three types of corrections to the Newtonian precession, of a gyroscope near a large mass such as the earth. They are:

- Thomas precession a special relativistic correction accounting for the observer being in a rotating non-inertial frame.
- de Sitter precession a general relativistic correction accounting for the Schwarzschild metric of curved space time near a large non-rotating mass.
- Lense-Thirring precession a general relativistic correction accounting for the frame dragging by the Kerr metric of curved space time near a large rotating mass.

== See also ==
- Schwarzschild geodesics, used in the prediction of the anomalous perihelion precession of the planets.
- Precession (disambiguation)
