= Reva Williams =

American astrophysicist

Reva Kay Williams
- Education: Malcolm X College; A.A. in liberal arts, 1977; Northwestern University; BA in astronomy & physics, 1980; Indiana University Bloomington; MA in astrophysics, 1990; Indiana University Bloomington; Ph.D. in astrophysics, 1991
- Known for: First person to successfully work out the Penrose process First Black American woman to receive a PhD in theoretical astrophysics Frame-dragging; Gravitomagnetism
- Scientific career
- Fields: Astrophysics
- Institutions: University of Toledo; University of Florida; Bennett College
- Thesis: Extracting X-rays, gamma rays, and electron-positron pairs from supermassive Kerr black holes using the Penrose mechanism (1991)
- Doctoral advisor: Richard H. Durisen

Reva Kay Williams is a theoretical astrophysicist. She is the first person to successfully work out the Penrose process using Einstein's Theory of Relativity to extract energy from black holes. Also, she is the first Black American woman to earn a PhD in theoretical astrophysics. Her work focuses on general relativistic astrophysics.

== Early life and education ==
Williams was born in Memphis, Tennessee and moved to Chicago at the age of 6. She received an AA in liberal arts from Malcolm X College in 1977 and a BA in astronomy from Northwestern University in 1980. Williams completed both a MA and a PhD at Indiana University Bloomington, and when she completed her degree in 1991 she became the first Black American woman to receive a doctorate in theoretical astrophysics.

=== Penrose process ===
With the publication of her PhD thesis in 1991, Williams became the first person to work out the Penrose process of black holes. In 1995, Williams published a paper in Physical Review D of research from her PhD thesis. Her calculations explained that black hole jets are emitted as escaping tornado-like coils of high energy photons and relativistic electrons, and as black holes drag spacetime into rotation near their cores, they may also produce uneven jets.

In April 2004, Williams published a letter titled "A Word from a Black Female Relativistic Astrophysicist: Setting the Record Straight on Black Holes" addressing her experience with breakthrough black hole physics and not receiving appropriate citations and others taking credit for her work.

== Postdoctoral career ==
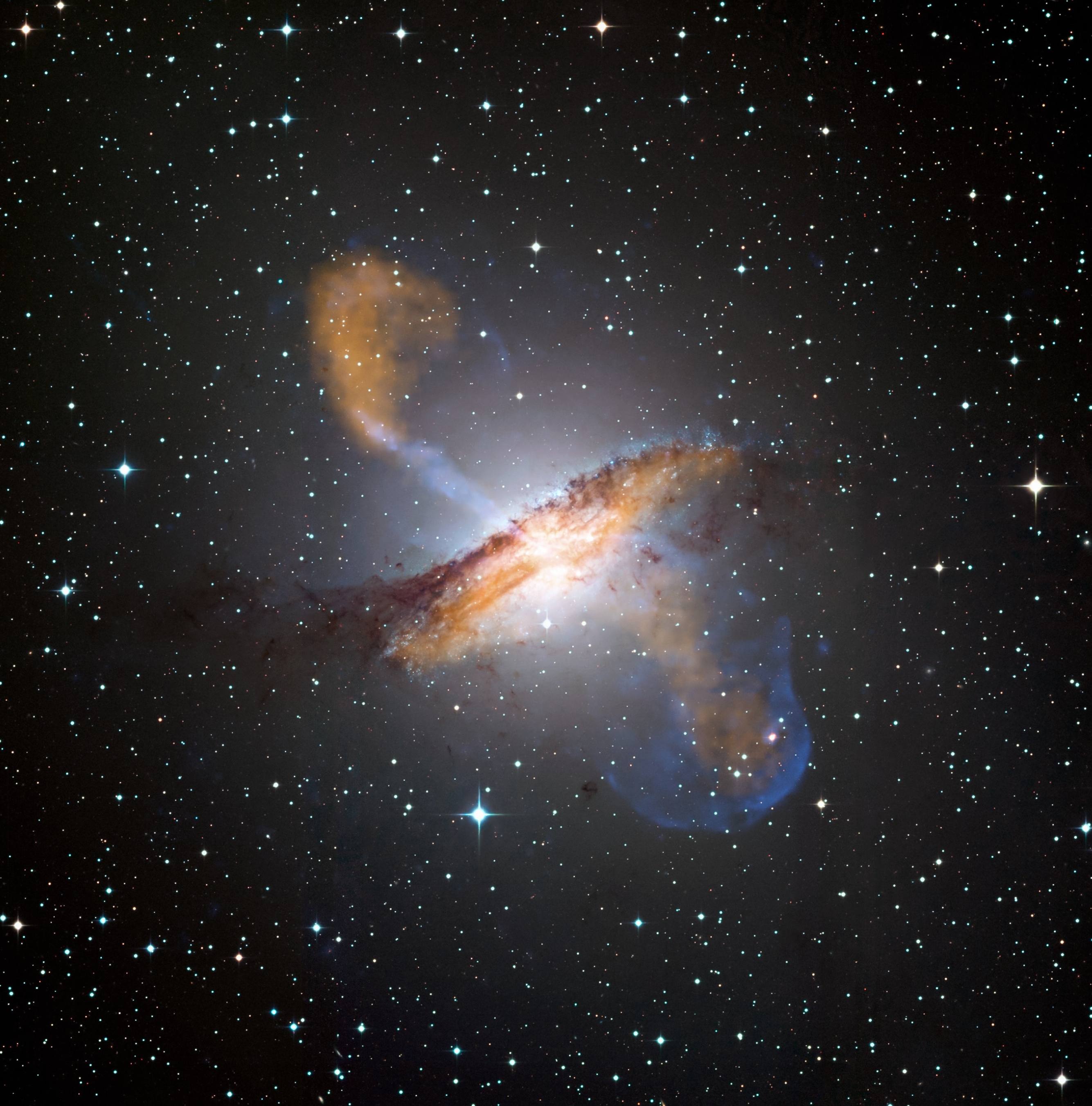
Williams was the first person to successfully work out the Penrose process, which explains how energy can be extracted from a black hole. Above, a spectacular view of black hole outflows from the radio galaxy Centaurus A.

Williams was awarded a National Research Council Ford postdoctoral minority fellowship and was a postdoctoral associate at the University of Florida from 1993 to 1996. In January 1997, she worked as a visiting assistant professor of physics at North Carolina Agricultural and Technical State University (North Carolina A&T), and in 1998, she became an associate professor of astrophysics and director of the Center for Women and Science at Bennett College, remaining in that position until 2001.

In 2000, Williams received a grant to work with Robert M. Hjellming in Aspen, Colorado and Socorro, New Mexico studying microquasars. At that time, she was considered as the only Black American female astrophysicist in the United States, and as of 2004 was one of the few women in the world researching black holes.

In 2009, she was awarded a National Science Foundation grant to "investigate the jet structure and energy generation of quasars and other active galactic nuclei (AGNs), microquasars, and gamma-ray bursters, all of which are believed to be powered by rotating (Kerr) black holes".

Since 2009, Williams has been a research assistant professor at the University of Toledo. Her continuing research interests are relativistic astrophysics, general relativity, cosmology, and extragalactic astronomy.

Williams gave a plenary speech at the astrobiology conference, AbSciCon, in the spring of 2022, organized by American Geophysical Union and NASA.

== Selected publications ==
- Williams, RK (15 May 1995). "Extracting x rays, gamma rays, and relativistic e^{−}e^{+} pairs from supermassive Kerr black holes using the Penrose mechanism". Physical Review D. 51 (10): 5387–5427. Bibcode:1995PhRvD..51.5387W. doi:10.1103/physrevd.51.5387. PMID 10018300.
- Williams, Reva Kay (November 1999). "Extracting Energy-Momentum from Rotating Black Holes Using the Penrose Mechanism". 66th Annual Meeting of the Southeastern Section of the American Physical Society. 66. Bibcode:1999APS..SES..JD03W.
- Williams, R.K. (May 2000). "Production of the High Energy-Momentum Spectra of Quasars 3C 279 and 3C 273 Using the Penrose Mechanism". Bulletin of the American Astronomical Society. 32: 754. Bibcode:2000AAS...196.5021W.
- Williams, Reva Kay (August 2004). "Collimated Escaping Vortical Polar e^{−}e^{+} Jets Intrinsically Produced by Rotating Black Holes and Penrose Processes". The Astrophysical Journal. 611 (2): 952–963. arXiv:astro-ph/0404135. Bibcode:2004ApJ...611..952W. doi:10.1086/422304.
- Williams, Reva Kay (June 2005). "Gravitomagnetic field and Penrose scattering processes". Annals of the New York Academy of Sciences. 1045: 232–45. Bibcode:2005NYASA1045..232W. doi:10.1196/annals.1350.018. PMID 15980315. S2CID 12183953.
