= Hans Thirring =

Austrian theoretical physicist (1888-1976)

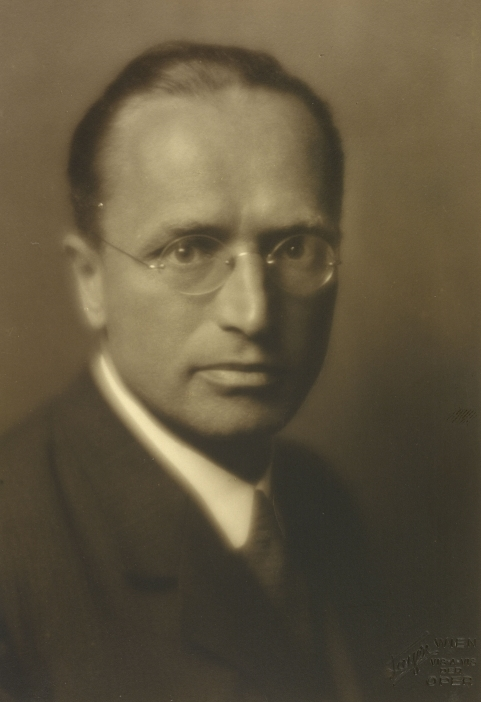
- Born: 23 March 1888; Vienna, Austria-Hungary
- Died: 22 March 1976 (aged 87); Vienna, Austria
- Education: University of Vienna
- Children: Walter Thirring
- Awards: Haitinger Prize (1920); Karl Renner Prize (1952)
- Scientific career
- Fields: Theoretical physics
- Workplaces: University of Vienna
- Doctoral advisor: Friedrich Hasenöhrl
- Doctoral students: Guido Beck; Eugene Guth; Otto Halpern; Julius Wess

Hans Thirring (23 March 1888 – 22 March 1976) was an Austrian theoretical physicist, professor, and father of the physicist Walter Thirring. He won the Haitinger Prize of the Austrian Academy of Sciences in 1920.

Together with the mathematician Josef Lense, he is known for the prediction of the Lense–Thirring frame dragging effect of general relativity in 1918.

He received a deferment during World War I because he had broken one of his feet while skiing. He was a leading pacifist before the Anschluss and after World War II. But he could not save his older son, who was declared missing in action during the final two months of World War II. His body was never located.

Along with Albert Einstein, Thirring was one of the sponsors of the Peoples' World Convention (PWC), also known as Peoples' World Constituent Assembly (PWCA), which took place in 1950-51 at Palais Electoral, Geneva, Switzerland.

Hans Thirring served as an assistant, a professor, and head of the Institute for Theoretical Physics of the University of Vienna until his forced retirement in 1938 after the Anschluss, the annexation of Austria by Nazi Germany. After the end of World War II, he was reinstated and became dean of the philosophical faculty in the years 1946–1947. He was active in the Socialist Party of Austria and served as a member of the Federal Council of Austria during 1957–1963. He was also a teacher of the philosopher of science Paul Feyerabend.

== See also ==
- Emission theory
