= Gravitoelectromagnetism =

Analogies between Maxwell's and Einstein's field equations

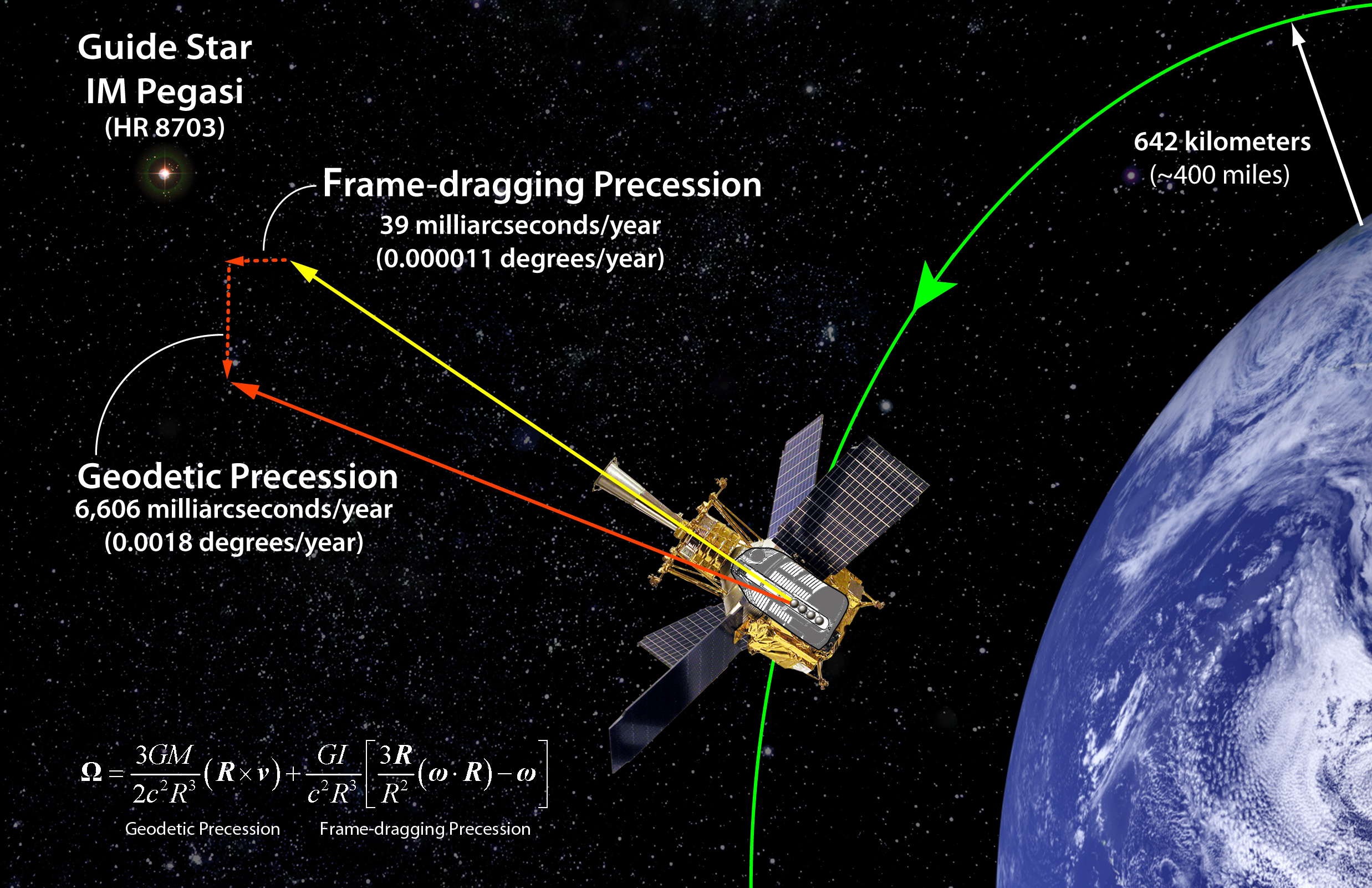
Diagram regarding the confirmation of gravitomagnetism by Gravity Probe B

Gravitoelectromagnetism, abbreviated GEM, is a set of formal analogies between the equations for electromagnetism and relativistic gravitation. More specifically, it is an analogy between Maxwell's field equations and an approximation, valid under certain conditions, to the Einstein field equations for general relativity. Gravitomagnetism is the kinetic effects of gravity, in analogy to the magnetic effects of moving electric charge. The most common version of GEM is valid only far from isolated sources, and for slowly moving test particles.

The analogy and equations differing only by some small factors were first published in 1893, before general relativity, by Oliver Heaviside as a separate theory expanding Newton's law of universal gravitation.

== Background ==
This approximate reformulation of gravitation as described by general relativity in the weak field limit makes an apparent field appear in a frame of reference different from that of a freely moving inertial body. This apparent field may be described by two components that act respectively like the electric and magnetic fields of electromagnetism, and by analogy these are called the gravitoelectric and gravitomagnetic fields, since these arise in the same way around a mass that a moving electric charge is the source of electric and magnetic fields. The main consequence of the gravitomagnetic field, or velocity-dependent acceleration, is that a moving object near a massive, rotating object will experience acceleration that deviates from that predicted by a purely Newtonian gravity (gravitoelectric) field. More subtle predictions, such as induced rotation of a falling object and precession of a spinning object are among the last basic predictions of general relativity to be directly tested.

Indirect validations of gravitomagnetic effects have been derived from analyses of relativistic jets. Roger Penrose had proposed a mechanism that relies on frame-dragging-related effects for extracting energy and momentum from rotating black holes. Reva Kay Williams developed a rigorous proof that validated Penrose's mechanism. Her model showed how the Lense–Thirring effect could account for the observed high energies and luminosities of quasars and active galactic nuclei; the collimated jets about their polar axis; and the asymmetrical jets (relative to the orbital plane). All of those observed properties could be explained in terms of gravitomagnetic effects. Williams's application of Penrose's mechanism can be applied to black holes of any size. Relativistic jets can serve as the largest and brightest form of validations for gravitomagnetism.

The Gravity Probe B satellite experiment, using four cryogenic gyroscopes in Earth orbit, provided direct evidence of frame-dragging consistent with theoretical predictions of general relativity.

Physical analogues of fields
Gravitomagnetism – gravitomagnetic field H due to (total) angular momentum J.

Electromagnetism – magnetic field B due to a dipole moment m ...

... or, equivalently, current I, same field profile, and field generation due to rotation.

Fluid mechanics – rotational fluid drag of a solid sphere immersed in fluid, analogous directions and senses of rotation as magnetism, analogous interaction to frame dragging for the gravitomagnetic interaction.

== Equations ==
According to general relativity, the gravitational field produced by a rotating object (or any rotating mass–energy) can, in a particular limiting case, be described by equations that have the same form as in classical electromagnetism. Starting from the basic equation of general relativity, the Einstein field equation, and assuming a weak gravitational field or reasonably flat spacetime, the gravitational analogs to Maxwell's equations for electromagnetism, called the "GEM equations", can be derived. The GEM equations compared to Maxwell's equations are:

Comparison of GEM and Maxwell's equations
Law	GEM equations	Maxwell's equations
Gauss's law	$\nabla \cdot \mathbf{E}_\text{g} = -4 \pi G \rho_\text{g} \$	$\nabla \cdot \mathbf{E} = \frac{\rho}{\varepsilon_0}$
Gauss's law for magnetism	$\nabla \cdot \mathbf{B}_\text{g} = 0 \$	$\nabla \cdot \mathbf{B} = 0 \$
Faraday's law of induction	$\nabla \times \mathbf{E}_\text{g} + \frac{\partial \mathbf{B}_\text{g} } {\partial t} = 0$	$\nabla \times \mathbf{E} + \frac{\partial \mathbf{B} } {\partial t} = 0$
Ampère–Maxwell law	$\nabla \times \mathbf{B}_\text{g} - \frac{1}{c^2} \frac{\partial \mathbf{E}_\text{g}} {\partial t} = -\frac{4 \pi G}{c^2} \mathbf{J}_\text{g}$	$\nabla \times \mathbf{B} - \frac{1}{c^2} \frac{\partial \mathbf{E}} {\partial t} = \frac{1}{\varepsilon_0 c^2} \mathbf{J}$

where:

- E_{g} is the gravitoelectric field (conventional gravitational field), with SI unit m⋅s^{−2}
- E is the electric field, with SI unit kg⋅m⋅s^{−3}⋅A^{−1}
- B_{g} is the gravitomagnetic field, with SI unit s^{−1}
- B is the magnetic field, with SI unit kg⋅s^{−2}⋅A^{−1}
- ρ_{g} is mass density, with SI unit kg⋅m^{−3}
- ρ is charge density, with SI unit A⋅s⋅m^{−3}
- J_{g} is mass current density or mass flux, with SI unit kg⋅m^{−2}⋅s^{−1}
- J is electric current density, with SI unit A⋅m^{−2}
- G is the gravitational constant, with SI unit m^{3}⋅kg^{−1}⋅s^{−2}
- ε_{0} is the vacuum permittivity, with SI unit kg^{−1}⋅m^{−3}⋅s^{4}⋅A^{2}
- c is both the speed of propagation of gravity and the speed of light, with SI unit m⋅s^{−1}.

=== Potentials ===
Faraday's law of induction (third line of the table) and the Gaussian law for the gravitomagnetic field (second line of the table) can be solved by the definition of a gravitation potential $\phi_\text{g}$ and the vector potential $\mathbf{A}_\text{g}$ according to:
$$\mathbf{E}_\text{g} := - \mbox{grad}~\phi_\text{g} - \frac{\partial \mathbf{A}_\text{g}}{\partial t} = - \nabla~\phi_\text{g} - \frac{\partial \mathbf{A}_\text{g}}{\partial t}$$
and
$$\mathbf{B}_\text{g}  := \mbox{rot}~\mathbf{A}_\text{g} = \nabla \times \mathbf{A}_\text{g}$$

Inserting this four potentials $\left( \phi_\text{g}, \mathbf{A}_\text{g} \right)$ into the Gaussian law for the gravitation field (first line of the table) and Ampère's circuital law (fourth line of the table) and applying the Lorenz gauge the following inhomogeneous wave-equations are obtained:
$$- \frac{1}{c^2} \frac{\partial^2 \phi_\text{g}}{\partial t^2} + \nabla^2~\phi_\text{g}  = 4 \pi G \rho_\text{g}$$
$$- \frac{1}{c^2} \frac{\partial^2 \mathbf{A}_\text{g}}{\partial t^2} + \nabla^2~\mathbf{A}_\text{g} = \frac{4 \pi G}{c^2}  \rho_\text{g} \mathbf{v}$$

For a stationary situation ($\partial \phi_\text{g}/\partial t = 0$) the Poisson equation of the classical gravitation theory is obtained. In a vacuum ($\rho_\text{g} = 0$) a wave equation is obtained under non-stationary conditions. GEM therefore predicts the existence of gravitational waves. In this way GEM can be regarded as a generalization of Newton's gravitation theory.

The wave equation for the gravitomagnetic potential $\mathbf{A}_\text{g}$ can also be solved for a rotating spherical body (which is a stationary case) leading to gravitomagnetic moments.

=== Lorentz force ===
For a test particle whose mass m is "small", in a stationary system, the net (Lorentz) force acting on it due to a GEM field is described by the following GEM analog to the Lorentz force equation:

Lorentz force equations in GEM and electromagnetism
GEM equation	EM equation
$\mathbf{F}_\text{g} = m \left( \mathbf{E}_\text{g} \ + \ \mathbf{v} \times 4 \mathbf{B}_\text{g} \right)$	$\mathbf{F} = q \left( \mathbf{E} \ + \ \mathbf{v} \times \mathbf{B} \right)$

where:

- v is the velocity of the test particle
- m is the mass of the test particle
- q is the electric charge of the test particle.

=== Poynting vector ===
The GEM Poynting vector compared to the electromagnetic Poynting vector is given by:

Poynting vector equations in GEM and electromagnetism
GEM equation	EM equation
$\mathcal{S}_\text{g} = -\frac{c^2}{4 \pi G} \mathbf{E}_\text{g} \times 4 \mathbf{B}_\text{g}$	$\mathcal{S} = c^2 \varepsilon_0 \mathbf{E} \times \mathbf{B}$

=== Scaling of fields ===
The literature does not adopt a consistent scaling for the gravitoelectric and gravitomagnetic fields, making comparison tricky. For example, to obtain agreement with Mashhoon's writings, all instances of B_{g} in the GEM equations must be multiplied by − 1/2c and E_{g} by −1. These factors variously modify the analogues of the equations for the Lorentz force. There is no scaling choice that allows all the GEM and EM equations to be perfectly analogous. The discrepancy in the factors arises because the source of the gravitational field is the second order stress–energy tensor, as opposed to the source of the electromagnetic field being the first order four-current tensor. This difference becomes clearer when one compares non-invariance of relativistic mass to electric charge invariance. This can be traced back to the spin-2 character of the gravitational field, in contrast to the electromagnetism being a spin-1 field. (See Relativistic wave equations for more on "spin-1" and "spin-2" fields.)

== Higher-order effects ==
Some higher-order gravitomagnetic effects can reproduce effects reminiscent of the interactions of more conventional polarized charges. For instance, if two wheels are spun on a common axis, the mutual gravitational attraction between the two wheels will be greater if they spin in opposite directions than in the same direction. This can be expressed as an attractive or repulsive gravitomagnetic component.

Gravitomagnetic arguments also predict that a flexible or fluid toroidal mass undergoing minor axis rotational acceleration (accelerating "smoke ring" rotation) will tend to pull matter through the throat (a case of rotational frame dragging, acting through the throat). In theory, this configuration might be used for accelerating objects (through the throat) without such objects experiencing any g-forces.

Consider a toroidal mass with two degrees of rotation: major-axis spin (rotation around the throat) and minor-axis spin ("smoke ring" rotation). This represents a case in which gravitomagnetic effects generate a chiral corkscrew-like gravitational field around the object. The reaction forces to dragging at the inner and outer equators would normally be expected to be equal and opposite in magnitude and direction respectively in the simpler case involving only minor-axis spin. When both rotations are applied simultaneously, these two sets of reaction forces can be said to occur at different depths in a radial Coriolis field that extends across the rotating torus, making it more difficult to establish whether cancellation is complete. Modelling this complex behaviour as a curved spacetime problem has yet to be done.

== Gravitomagnetic fields of astronomical objects ==
A rotating spherical body with a homogeneous density distribution produces a stationary gravitomagnetic potential, which is described by:
$$\nabla^2 \mathbf{A}_\text{g} = - \frac{4 \pi G}{c^2}  \rho_\text{g} \mathbf{v}$$

Due to the body's angular velocity $\boldsymbol{\omega}$ the velocity inside the body can be described as $\mathbf{v} = \boldsymbol{\omega} \times \mathbf{r}$. Therefore
$$\nabla^2 \mathbf{A}_\text{g} = - \frac{4 \pi G}{c^2}  \rho_\text{g} \boldsymbol{\omega} \times \mathbf{r}$$
has to be solved to obtain the gravitomagnetic potential $\mathbf{A}_\text{g}$. The analytical solution outside of the body is (see for example):
$$\mathbf{A}_{\text{g}} = - \frac{G}{2 c^2} \frac{\mathbf{L}  \times \mathbf{r}}{r^3}$$
with
$$\mathbf{L} = I_\text{ball} \boldsymbol{\omega} = \frac{2 m R^2}{5} \frac{2 \pi}{T}$$
where:

- $\mathbf{L}$ is the angular momentum vector;
- $I_\text{ball} = \frac{2 m R^2}{5}$ is the moment of inertia of a ball-shaped body (see: List of moments of inertia);
- $\boldsymbol{\omega} = \frac{2\pi}{T}$ is the angular velocity;
- m is the mass;
- R is the radius;
- T is the rotational period.

The formula for the gravitomagnetic field B_{g} can now be obtained by:
$$\mathbf{B}_\text{g} = \nabla \times \mathbf{A}_\text{g} = \frac{G }{2 c^2} \frac{\mathbf{L} - 3(\mathbf{L} \cdot \mathbf{r}/r) \mathbf{r}/r}{r^3},$$

It is exactly half of the Lense–Thirring precession rate. This suggests that the gravitomagnetic analog of the g-factor is two. This factor of two can be explained completely analogous to the electron's g-factor by taking into account relativistic calculations. At the equatorial plane, r and L are perpendicular, so their dot product vanishes, and this formula reduces to:
$$\mathbf{B}_\text{g} = \frac{G }{2 c^2} \frac{\mathbf{L}}{r^3},$$

Gravitational waves have equal gravitomagnetic and gravitoelectric components.

=== Earth ===
Therefore, the magnitude of Earth's gravitomagnetic field at its equator is:
$$\mathbf{B}_\text{g,Earth} = \frac{G }{5 c^2} \frac{m}{r} \frac{2 \pi}{T} = \frac{2 \pi r g_0}{5c^2 T},$$
where $g_0 = G \frac{m}{r^2}$ is Earth's gravity. The field direction coincides with the angular moment direction, i.e. north.

== Lack of invariance ==
While Maxwell's equations are invariant under Lorentz transformations, the GEM equations are not. The fact that ρ_{g} and j_{g} do not form a four-vector is the basis of this difference. Instead they are merely a part of the stress–energy tensor, which is what acts as the source of the gravitational field in general relativity.

Although GEM may hold approximately in two different reference frames connected by a Lorentz boost, there is no way to calculate the GEM variables of one such frame from the GEM variables of the other, unlike the situation with the variables of electromagnetism. Indeed, their predictions (about what motion is free fall) will probably conflict with each other.

Note that the GEM equations are invariant under translations and spatial rotations, just not under boosts and more general curvilinear transformations. Maxwell's equations can be formulated in a way that makes them invariant under all of these coordinate transformations.

== See also ==
- Frame-dragging
- Geodetic effect
- Gravitational radiation
- Gravity Probe B
- Kaluza–Klein theory
- Linearized gravity
- Modified Newtonian dynamics
- Non-relativistic gravitational fields
- Speed of gravity § Electrodynamical analogies
