= Josef Lense =

Austrian physicist (1890–1985)

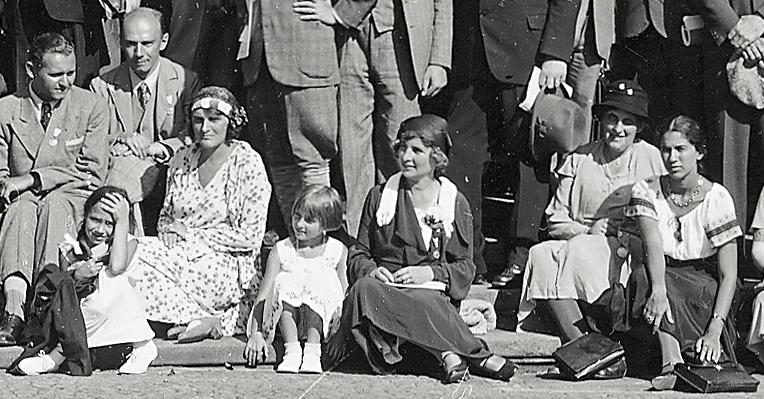
Josef Lense (2nd from left) and Ms. Lense (to his left) at the ICM 1932

Josef Lense (28 October 1890 in Vienna – 28 December 1985 in Munich) was an Austrian physicist.

In 1914, Lense obtained his doctorate under Samuel Oppenheim. From 1927-28, he was Professor ordinarius and from 1928–1946 Professor extraordinarius for applied mathematics at the Technical University of Munich. From 1946 until 1961, he was director of the mathematical institute of the same university.

Lense, together with Hans Thirring, is known as one of the two discoverers of the Lense-Thirring effect, which is a prediction arising from general relativity that the rotation of a large mass (for example a planet), should influence the rotation of an orbiting satellite.

== Publications ==
- Lense, J. and Thirring, H. Über den Einfluss der Eigenrotation der Zentralkörper auf die Bewegung der Planeten und Monde nach der Einsteinschen Gravitationstheorie. Physikalische Zeitschrift 19 156-63 (1918) [On the Influence of the Proper Rotation of Central Bodies on the Motions of Planets and Moons According to Einstein's Theory of Gravitation]
- Vorlesungen über höhere Mathematik. Leibniz-Verlag 1948 und weitere Auflagen.
- Vom Wesen der Mathematik und ihren Grundlagen. Leibniz-Verlag 1949.
- Kugelfunktionen. Geest und Portig 1954.
- Reihenentwicklungen in der mathematischen Physik. Verlag de Gruyter 1947, weitere Auflage 1953.
- Analytische projektive Geometrie. 1965.
