= Lense–Thirring precession =

Precession of a gyroscope due to a nearby celestial body's rotation affecting spacetime

In general relativity, Lense–Thirring precession or the Lense–Thirring effect (Austrian German: [ˈlɛnsɛ ˈtɪrɪŋ]; named after Josef Lense and Hans Thirring) is a relativistic correction to the precession of a gyroscope near a large rotating mass such as the Earth. It is a gravitomagnetic frame-dragging effect. It is a prediction of general relativity consisting of secular precessions of the longitude of the ascending node and the argument of pericenter of a test particle freely orbiting a central spinning mass endowed with angular momentum $S$.

The difference between de Sitter precession and the Lense–Thirring effect is that the de Sitter effect is due simply to the presence of a central mass, whereas the Lense–Thirring effect is due to the rotation of the central mass. The total precession is calculated by combining the de Sitter precession with the Lense–Thirring precession.

According to a 2007 historical analysis by Herbert Pfister, the effect should be renamed the Einstein–Thirring–Lense effect.

== Lense–Thirring metric ==
The gravitational field of a spinning spherical body of constant density was studied by Lense and Thirring in 1918, in the weak-field approximation. They obtained the metric
$$\mathrm ds^2
=\left(1-\frac{2GM}{rc^2}\right)c^2\,\mathrm dt^2
-\left(1+\frac{2GM}{rc^2}\right)\,\mathrm d\sigma^2
+4G\epsilon_{ijk}S^k \frac{x^i}{c^3r^3} c \,\mathrm dt\,\mathrm dx^j,$$
where the symbols represent:

- $\mathrm ds^2$ the metric,
- $\mathrm d\sigma^2 = \mathrm dx^2 + \mathrm dy^2 + \mathrm dz^2 = \mathrm dr^2 + r^2\mathrm d\theta^2 + r^2\sin^2\theta\,\mathrm d\varphi^2$ the flat-space line element in three dimensions,
- $r = \sqrt{x^2 + y^2 + z^2}$ the "radial" position of the observer,
- $c$ the speed of light,
- $G$ the gravitational constant,
- $\epsilon_{ijk}$ the completely antisymmetric Levi-Civita symbol,
- $M = \int T^{00} \,\mathrm d^3x$ the mass of the rotating body,
- $S_k = \int \epsilon_{klm}x^l T^{m0} \,\mathrm d^3x$ the angular momentum of the rotating body,
- $T^{\mu\nu}$ the energy–momentum tensor.

The above is the weak-field approximation of the full solution of the Einstein equations for a rotating body, known as the Kerr metric, which, due to the difficulty of its solution, was not obtained until 1965.

== Coriolis term ==
The frame-dragging effect can be demonstrated in several ways. One way is to solve for geodesics; these will then exhibit a Coriolis force-like term, except that, in this case (unlike the standard Coriolis force), the force is not fictional, but is due to frame dragging induced by the rotating body. So, for example, an (instantaneously) radially infalling geodesic at the equator will satisfy the equation
$$r\frac{\mathrm{d}^2\varphi}{\mathrm{d}t^2}
+2\frac{GJ}{c^2r^3}\frac{\mathrm{d}r}{\mathrm{d}t}
=0,$$
where

- $t$ is the time,
- $\varphi$ is the azimuthal angle (longitudinal angle),
- $J = \Vert S \Vert$ is the magnitude of the angular momentum of the spinning massive body.

The above can be compared to the standard equation for motion subject to the Coriolis force:
$$r\frac{\mathrm{d}^2\varphi}{\mathrm{d}t^2}
+2\omega\frac{\mathrm{d}r}{\mathrm{d}t} = 0,$$
where $\omega$ is the angular velocity of the rotating coordinate system. Note that, in either case, if the observer is not in radial motion, i.e. if $dr/dt = 0$, there is no effect on the observer.

== Precession ==
The frame-dragging effect will cause a gyroscope to precess. The rate of precession is given by
$$\Omega^k = -\frac{G}{c^2 r^3} \left[S^k - 3 \frac{(S \cdot x) x^k}{r^2}\right],$$
where:

- $\Omega$ is the angular velocity of the precession, a vector, and $\Omega_k$ one of its components,
- $S_k$ the angular momentum of the spinning body, as before,
- $S \cdot x$ the ordinary flat-metric inner product of the position and the angular momentum.

That is, if the gyroscope's angular momentum relative to the fixed stars is $L^i$, then it precesses as
$$\frac{\mathrm{d}L^i}{\mathrm{d}t} = \epsilon_{ijk} \Omega^j L^k.$$

The rate of precession is given by
$$\epsilon_{ijk} \Omega^k = -c\Gamma_{ij0},$$
where $\Gamma_{ij0}$ is the Christoffel symbol for the above metric. Gravitation by Misner, Thorne, and Wheeler provides hints on how to most easily calculate this.

== Gravitoelectromagnetic analysis ==
It is popular in some circles to use the gravitoelectromagnetic approach to the linearized field equations. The reason for this popularity should be immediately evident below, by contrasting it to the difficulties of working with the equations above. The linearized metric $h_{\mu\nu} = g_{\mu\nu} - \eta_{\mu\nu}$ can be read off from the Lense–Thirring metric given above, where $ds^2 = g_{\mu\nu} \,dx^\mu \,dx^\nu$, and $\eta_{\mu\nu} \,dx^\mu \,dx^\nu = c^2 \,dt^2 - dx^2 - dy^2 - dz^2$. In this approach, one writes the linearized metric, given in terms of the gravitomagnetic potentials $\phi$ and $\vec{A}$ is
$$h_{00} = \frac{-2\phi}{c^2}$$
and
$$h_{0i} = \frac{2A_i}{c^2},$$
where
$$\phi = \frac{GM}{r}$$
is the gravito-electric potential, and
$$\vec{A} = \frac {G}{r^3c} \vec{S} \times \vec{r}$$
is the gravitomagnetic potential. Here $\vec{r}$ is the 3D spatial coordinate of the observer, and $\vec{S}$ is the angular momentum of the rotating body, exactly as defined above. For $\partial_t \vec{A}=0$, the corresponding fields are
$$\vec{E} = -\nabla\phi$$
for the gravitoelectric field, and
$$\vec{B} = \vec{ \nabla} \times \vec{A}$$
is the gravitomagnetic field. It is then a matter of substitution and rearranging to obtain
$$\vec{B} = -\frac{G}{cr^3} \left[ \vec{S} - 3 \frac{(\vec{S}\cdot\vec{r}) \vec{r}}{r^2}\right]$$
as the gravitomagnetic field. Note that it proportional to the angular velocity vector $\Omega$ of Lense–Thirring precession with proportionality factor $c$. In this context, Lense–Thirring precession can be viewed as an analogue of Larmor precession.

For $\partial_t \vec{A}=0$, the gravitomagnetic analog of the Lorentz force in the non-relativistic limit is given by
$$\vec{F} = -m \vec{ E} - 2m \frac{\vec{v}}{c} \times \vec{B},$$
where $m$ is the mass of a test particle moving with velocity $\vec{v}$. This can be used in a straightforward way to compute the classical motion of bodies in the gravitomagnetic field. For example, a radially infalling body will have a velocity $\vec{v} = \hat{r} \,dr/dt$ with $dr/dt<0$; direct substitution yields the Coriolis term given in a previous section.

== Example: Foucault's pendulum ==
To get a sense of the magnitude of the effect, the above can be used to compute the rate of precession of Foucault's pendulum, located at the surface of the Earth.

Modeling the earth as a solid ball of uniform density of radius $R$ (which is only a very rough approximation), the moment of inertia is given by $2MR^2/5,$ so that the absolute value of the angular momentum $S$ is $\Vert S\Vert = 2MR^2\omega/5,$ with $\omega$ the angular speed of the spinning ball.

The direction of the spin of the Earth may be taken as the z axis, whereas the axis of the pendulum is perpendicular to the Earth's surface, in the radial direction. Thus, we may take $\hat{z} \cdot \hat{r} = \cos\theta$, where $\theta$ is the colatitude. Similarly, the location of the observer $r$ is at the Earth's surface $R$. This leaves rate of precession is as
$$\Omega_\text{LT} = \frac{4}{5} \frac{G M \omega}{c^2 R} \cos\theta.$$
As an example the latitude of the city of Nijmegen in the Netherlands is used for reference. This latitude gives a value for the Lense–Thirring precession based on the model of a uniform earth of
$$\Omega_\text{LT} = 5.7 \cdot 10^{-4} \text{ arcseconds}/\text{day}.$$
At this rate a Foucault pendulum would have to oscillate for about 17000 years for the Lense-Thirring precession alone to accumulate 1 degree.

The above does not include the de Sitter precession; it would need to be added to get the total relativistic precessions on Earth.

== Experimental verification ==
The Lense–Thirring effect, and the effect of frame dragging in general, continues to be studied experimentally. There are two basic settings for experimental tests: direct observation via satellites and spacecraft orbiting Earth, Mars or Jupiter, and indirect observation by measuring astrophysical phenomena, such as accretion disks surrounding black holes and neutron stars, or astrophysical jets from the same.

The Juno spacecraft's suite of science instruments will primarily characterize and explore the three-dimensional structure of Jupiter's polar magnetosphere, auroras and mass composition. As Juno is a polar-orbit mission, it will be possible to measure the orbital frame-dragging, known also as Lense–Thirring precession, caused by the angular momentum of Jupiter.

Results from astrophysical settings are presented after the following section.

== Astrophysical setting ==
A star orbiting a spinning supermassive black hole experiences Lense–Thirring precession, causing its orbital line of nodes to precess at a rate
$$\frac{\mathrm{d}\Omega}{\mathrm{d}t}
= \frac{2GS}{c^2 a^3 \left(1 - e^2\right)^{3/2}} =
\frac{2G^2 M^2\chi}{c^3 a^3 \left(1 - e^2\right)^{3/2}},$$
where

- a and e are the semimajor axis and eccentricity of the orbit,
- M is the mass of the black hole,
- χ is the dimensionless spin parameter (0 < χ < 1).

The precessing stars also exert a torque back on the black hole, causing its spin axis to precess, at a rate
$$\frac{\mathrm{d}\mathbf{S}}{\mathrm{d}t}
= \frac{2G}{c^2}\sum_j \frac{\mathbf{L}_j \times \mathbf{S}}{a_j^3 \left(1 - e_j^2\right)^{3/2}},$$
where

- L_{j} is the angular momentum of the jth star,
- a_{j} and e_{j} are its semimajor axis and eccentricity.

A gaseous accretion disk that is tilted with respect to a spinning black hole will experience Lense–Thirring precession, at a rate given by the above equation, after setting e = 0 and identifying a with the disk radius. Because the precession rate varies with distance from the black hole, the disk will "wrap up", until viscosity forces the gas into a new plane, aligned with the black hole's spin axis.

== Astrophysical tests ==
The orientation of an astrophysical jet can be used as evidence to deduce the orientation of an accretion disk; a rapidly changing jet orientation suggests a reorientation of the accretion disk, as described above. Exactly such a change was observed in 2019 with the black hole X-ray binary in V404 Cygni.

Pulsars emit rapidly repeating radio pulses with extremely high regularity, which can be measured with microsecond precision over time spans of years and even decades. A 2020 study reports the observation of a pulsar in a tight orbit with a white dwarf, to sub-millisecond precision over two decades. The precise determination allows the change of orbital parameters to be studied; these confirm the operation of the Lense–Thirring effect in this astrophysical setting.

It may be possible to detect the Lense–Thirring effect by long-term measurement of the orbit of the S2 star around the supermassive black hole in the center of the Milky Way, using the GRAVITY instrument of the Very Large Telescope. The star orbits with a period of 16 years, and it should be possible to constrain the angular momentum of the black hole by observing the star over two to three periods (32 to 48 years).

== See also ==
- Gravity Probe B
