= Speed =

Magnitude of velocity

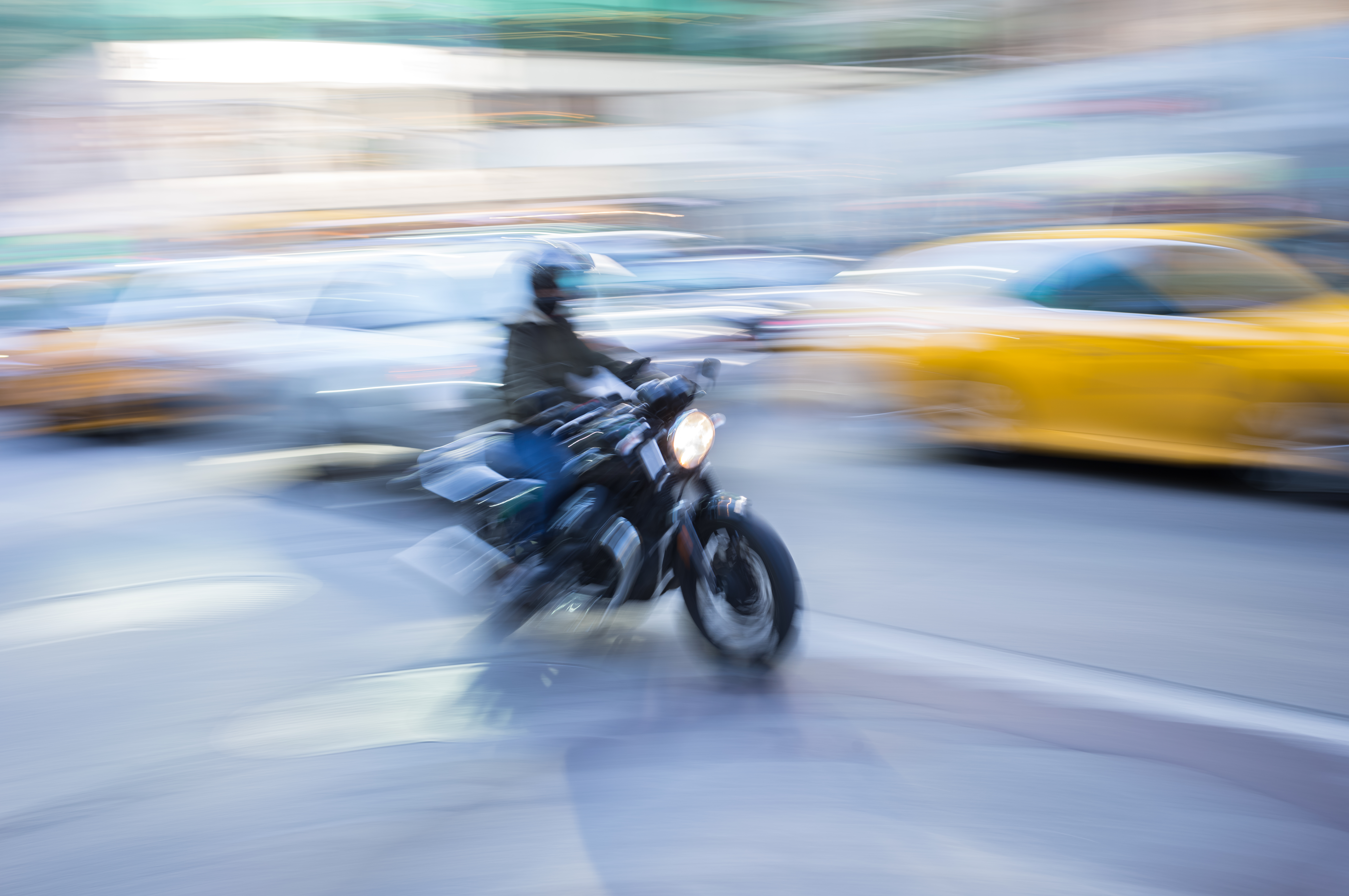
- Speed can be thought of as the rate at which an object covers distance. A fast-moving object has a high speed and covers a relatively large distance in a given amount of time, while a slow-moving object covers a relatively small amount of distance in the same amount of time.
- Common symbols: v
- SI unit: m/s, m s^{−1}
- Dimension: L T^{−1}

In kinematics, the speed of a moving object is the rate at which the distance travelled by the object changes with time. The average speed of an object in an interval of time is the distance travelled by the object divided by the duration of the interval; the instantaneous speed is the limit of the average speed as the duration of the time interval approaches zero. Speed is the magnitude of velocity (a vector), which indicates additionally the direction of motion.

Speed has the dimensions of distance divided by time. The SI unit of speed is the metre per second (m/s). The kilometre per hour (km/h) or, in the US and the UK, miles per hour (mph), are also used as units of speed. For air and marine travel, the knot is commonly used.

The fastest possible speed at which energy or information can travel, according to special relativity, is the speed of light in vacuum c = 299792458 metres per second (approximately 1079000000 km/h or 671000000 mph). Matter cannot reach the speed of light, as this would require an infinite amount of energy. In relativity physics, the concept of rapidity replaces the classical idea of speed.

== Definition ==
=== Historical definition ===
Italian physicist Galileo Galilei is usually credited with being the first to measure speed by considering the distance covered and the time it takes. Galileo defined speed as the distance covered per unit of time. In equation form, that is
$$v = \frac{d}{t},$$
where $v$ is speed, $d$ is distance, and $t$ is time. A cyclist who covers 30 metres in a time of 2 seconds, for example, has a speed of 15 metres per second. Objects in motion often have variations in speed (a car might travel along a street at 50 km/h, slow to 0 km/h, and then reach 30 km/h).

=== Instantaneous speed ===
Speed at some instant, or assumed constant during a very short period of time, is called instantaneous speed. By looking at a speedometer, one can read the instantaneous speed of a car at any instant. A car travelling at 50 km/h generally goes for less than one hour at a constant speed, but if it did go at that speed for a full hour, it would travel 50 km. If the vehicle continued at that speed for half an hour, it would cover half that distance (25 km). If it continued for only one minute, it would cover about 833 m.

In mathematical terms, the instantaneous speed $v$ is defined as the magnitude of the instantaneous velocity $\boldsymbol{v}$, that is, the derivative of the position $\boldsymbol{r}$ with respect to time:
$$v = \left|\boldsymbol v\right| = \left|\dot {\boldsymbol r}\right| = \left|\frac{d\boldsymbol r}{dt}\right|\,.$$

If $s$ is the length of the path (also known as the distance) travelled until time $t$, the speed equals the time derivative of $s$:
$$v = \frac{ds}{dt}.$$

In the special case where the velocity is constant (that is, constant speed in a straight line), this can be simplified to $v = s/t$.

=== Average speed ===
As an example, a bowling ball's speed when first released will be above its average speed, and after decelerating because of friction, its speed when reaching the pins will be below its average speed.

Different from instantaneous speed, average speed is defined as the total distance covered divided by the time interval. For example, if a distance of 80 kilometres is driven in 1 hour, the average speed is 80 kilometres per hour. Likewise, if 320 kilometres are travelled in 4 hours, the average speed is also 80 kilometres per hour. When a distance in kilometres (km) is divided by a time in hours (h), the result is in kilometres per hour (km/h).

Average speed does not describe the speed variations that may have taken place during shorter time intervals (as it is the entire distance covered divided by the total time of travel), and so average speed is often quite different from a value of instantaneous speed. If the average speed and the time of travel are known, the distance travelled can be calculated by rearranging the definition to
$$d = \boldsymbol{\bar{v}}t\,.$$

Using this equation for an average speed of 80 kilometres per hour on a 4-hour trip, the distance covered is found to be 320 kilometres.

Expressed in graphical language, the slope of a tangent line at any point of a distance-time graph is the instantaneous speed at this point, while the slope of a chord line of the same graph is the average speed during the time interval covered by the chord.

== Related quantities ==
=== Velocity ===
Speed denotes only how fast an object is moving, whereas velocity describes both how fast and in which direction the object is moving. If a car is said to travel at 60 km/h, its speed has been specified. However, if the car is said to move at 60 km/h to the north, its velocity has now been specified.

The big difference can be discerned when considering movement around a circle. When something moves in a circular path and returns to its starting point, its average velocity is zero, but its average speed is found by dividing the circumference of the circle by the time taken to move around the circle. This is because the average velocity is calculated by considering only the displacement between the starting and end points, whereas the average speed considers the total distance travelled.

=== Tangential speed ===
Tangential speed (v) and angular speed (ω) on a spinning disc of radius r.

Tangential speed is the speed of an object undergoing circular motion, i.e., moving along a circular path. A point on the outside edge of a merry-go-round or turntable travels a greater distance in one complete rotation than a point nearer the center. Travelling a greater distance in the same time means a greater speed, and so linear speed is greater on the outer edge of a rotating object than it is closer to the axis. This speed along a circular path is known as tangential speed because the direction of motion is tangent to the circumference of the circle. For circular motion, the terms linear speed and tangential speed are used interchangeably, and is measured in SI units as meters per second (m/s).

=== Slowness ===
In seismology, slowness (symbol p or s) is a physical quantity defined as the reciprocal of velocity, $p=v ^{-1}$. It has quantity dimension (and unit of measurement) of time per distance (seconds per metre), instead of distance per time (metres per second) used in velocity. In general it is a vector quantity, the slowness vector, but it may also be defined as a scalar quantity, the reciprocal speed.

== Units ==
Units of speed include:

- metres per second (symbol m s^{−1} or m/s), the SI derived unit;
- kilometres per hour (symbol km/h);
- miles per hour (symbol mi/h or mph);
- knots (nautical miles per hour, symbol kn or kt);
- feet per second (symbol fps or ft/s);
- Mach number (dimensionless), speed divided by the speed of sound;
- in natural units (dimensionless), speed divided by the speed of light in vacuum (symbol c = 299792458 m/s).

Conversions between common units of speed
	m/s	km/h	mph (mi/h)	knot	fps (ft/s)
1 m/s =	1	3.600000	2.236936*	1.943844*	3.280840*
1 km/h =	0.277778*	1	0.621371*	0.539957*	0.911344*
1 mph (mi/h) =	0.44704	1.609344	1	0.868976*	1.466667*
1 knot =	0.514444*	1.852	1.150779*	1	1.687810*
1 fps (ft/s) =	0.3048	1.09728	0.681818*	0.592484*	1

(* = approximate values)

== Examples ==
Speed	m/s	ft/s	km/h	mph	Notes
Global average sea level rise	0.00000000011	0.00000000036	0.0000000004	0.00000000025	3.5 mm/year
Approximate rate of continental drift	0.0000000013	0.0000000042	0.0000000045	0.0000000028	4 cm/year. Varies depending on location.
Speed of a common snail	0.001	0.003	0.004	0.002	1 millimetre per second
A brisk walk	1.7	5.5	6.1	3.8	
A typical road cyclist	4.4	14.4	16	10	Varies widely by person, terrain, bicycle, effort, weather
A fast martial arts kick	7.7	25.2	27.7	17.2	Fastest kick recorded at 130 milliseconds from floor to target at 1 meter distance. Average velocity speed across kick duration
Sprint runners	12.2	40	43.92	27	Usain Bolt's 100 metres world record.
Approximate average speed of road race cyclists	12.5	41.0	45	28	On flat terrain, will vary
Typical suburban speed limit in most of the world	13.8	45.3	50	30	
Taipei 101 observatory elevator	16.7	54.8	60.6	37.6	1010 m/min
Typical rural speed limit	24.6	80.66	88.5	56	
British National Speed Limit (single carriageway)	26.8	88	96.56	60	
Category 1 hurricane	33	108	119	74	Minimum sustained speed over one minute
Average peak speed of a cheetah	33.53	110	120.7	75	
Speed limit on a French autoroute	36.1	118	130	81	
Highest recorded human-powered speed	37.02	121.5	133.2	82.8	Sam Whittingham in a recumbent bicycle
Average speed of Human sneeze	44.44	145.82	160	99.42	
Muzzle velocity of a paintball marker	90	295	320	200	
Cruising speed of a Boeing 747-8 passenger jet	255	836	917	570	Mach 0.85 at 35000 ft (10668 m) altitude
Speed of a .22 caliber long rifle bullet	326.14	1070	1174.09	729.55	
The official land speed record	341.1	1119.1	1227.98	763	
The speed of sound in dry air at sea-level pressure and 20 °C	343	1125	1235	768	Mach 1 by definition. 20 °C = 293.15 kelvins.
Muzzle velocity of a 7.62×39mm cartridge	710	2330	2600	1600	The 7.62×39mm round is a rifle cartridge of Soviet origin
Official flight airspeed record for jet engined aircraft	980	3215	3530	2194	Lockheed SR-71 Blackbird
Space Shuttle on re-entry	7800	25600	28000	17,500	
Escape velocity on Earth	11200	36700	40000	25000	11.2 km·s^{−1}
Voyager 1 relative velocity to the Sun in 2013	17000	55800	61200	38000	Fastest heliocentric recession speed of any humanmade object. (11 mi/s)
Average orbital speed of planet Earth around the Sun	29783	97713	107218	66623	
The fastest recorded speed of the Helios probes	70,220	230,381	252,792	157,078	Recognized as the fastest speed achieved by a man-made spacecraft, achieved in solar orbit.
Orbital speed of the Sun relative to the center of the galaxy	251000	823000	904000	561000	
Speed of the Galaxy relative to the CMB	550000	1800000	2000000	1240000	
Speed of light in vacuum (symbol c)	299792458	983571056	1079252848	670616629	Exactly 299792458 m/s, by definition of the metre
Speed	m/s	ft/s	km/h	mph	Notes

== Psychology ==
According to Jean Piaget, the intuition for the notion of speed in humans precedes that of duration, and is based on the notion of outdistancing. Piaget studied this subject inspired by a question asked to him in 1928 by Albert Einstein: "In what order do children acquire the concepts of time and speed?" Children's early concept of speed is based on "overtaking", taking only temporal and spatial orders into consideration, specifically: "A moving object is judged to be more rapid than another when at a given moment the first object is behind and a moment or so later ahead of the other object."

== See also ==
- Air speed
- List of vehicle speed records
- Typical projectile speeds
- Speedometer
- V speeds
- Walking speed

Linear/translational quantities				Angular/rotational quantities			
Dimensions	1	L	L^{2}	Dimensions	1	θ	θ^{2}
T	time: t s	absement: A m s		T	time: t s		
1		distance: d, position: r, s, x, displacement: d m	area: A m^{2}	1		angle: θ, angular displacement: θ rad	solid angle: Ω rad^{2}, sr
T^{−1}	frequency: f s^{−1}, Hz	speed: v, velocity: v m s^{−1}	kinematic viscosity: ν, specific angular momentum: h m^{2} s^{−1}	T^{−1}	frequency: f, rotational speed: n, rotational velocity: n s^{−1}, Hz	angular speed: ω, angular velocity: ω rad s^{−1}	
T^{−2}		acceleration: a m s^{−2}		T^{−2}	rotational acceleration s^{−2}	angular acceleration: α rad s^{−2}	
T^{−3}		jerk: j m s^{−3}		T^{−3}		angular jerk: ζ rad s^{−3}	
M	mass: m kg	weighted position: M ⟨x⟩ = ∑ m x	moment of inertia: I kg m^{2}	ML			
MT^{−1}	Mass flow rate: $\dot{m}$ kg s^{−1}	momentum: p, impulse: J kg m s^{−1}, N s	action: 𝒮, actergy: ℵ kg m^{2} s^{−1}, J s	MLT^{−1}		angular momentum: L, angular impulse: ΔL kg m rad s^{−1}	
MT^{−2}		force: F, weight: F_{g} kg m s^{−2}, N	energy: E, work: W, Lagrangian: L kg m^{2} s^{−2}, J	MLT^{−2}		torque: τ, moment: M kg m rad s^{−2}, N m	
MT^{−3}		yank: Y kg m s^{−3}, N s^{−1}	power: P kg m^{2} s^{−3}, W	MLT^{−3}		rotatum: P kg m rad s^{−3}, N m s^{−1}	
