= List of physical quantities =

This article consists of tables outlining a number of physical quantities. A physical quantity is a property of a material or system that can be quantified by measurement; it has a value and units. The International System of Quantities, which underlies the International System of Units, defines seven base quantities; other quantities are generally derived quantities, which can be expressed in terms of the base quantities.

Neither the names nor the symbols used for the physical quantities are set by international standards, although ISO/IEC 80000 does list many of these without making them normative. Some quantities are known by several different names and symbols. The table typically lists the name and symbol that is most commonly used.

The final column lists some properties and characteristics that a quantity has, such as their scaling behaviour (e.g. whether the quantity is intensive or extensive), their transformation properties (i.e. whether the quantity is a scalar, vector, matrix or tensor), and whether the quantity is conserved.

== Scalar ==
Scalar quantities
Name	Symbol	Description	SI unit	Quantity dimension	Comments
absorbed dose rate	D	Absorbed dose received per unit of time	Gy/s	L^{2} T^{−3}	
action	S	Momentum of particle multiplied by distance travelled	J/Hz	M L^{2} T^{−1}	
amount of substance	n	The quantity proportional to the number of particles in a sample, with the Avogadro constant as the proportionality constant	mole (mol)	N	ISQ base quantity, extensive
angle	θ	Angular distance	radian (rad)	1	
angular acceleration	ω_{a}	Change in angular velocity per unit time	rad/s^{2}	T^{−2}	
area	A, S	Extent of a two-dimensional geometric shape	m^{2}	L^{2}	extensive, bivector or scalar
area density	ρ_{A}	Mass per unit area	kg⋅m^{−2}	M L^{−2}	intensive
capacitance	C	Stored charge per unit electric potential	farad (F = C/V)	M^{−1} L^{−2} T^{4} I^{2}	
catalytic activity concentration		Change in reaction rate due to presence of a catalyst per unit volume of the system	kat⋅m^{−3}	L^{−3} T^{−1} N	intensive
chemical potential	μ	Energy per unit change in amount of substance	J/mol	M L^{2} T^{−2} N^{−1}	intensive
density (or volume density)	ρ	Mass per unit volume	kg/m^{3}	M L^{−3}	intensive
dose equivalent	H	Received radiation adjusted for the effect on biological tissue	sievert (Sv = J/kg)	L^{2} T^{−2}	intensive
electric charge	Q	The force per unit electric field strength	coulomb (C = A⋅s)	T I	extensive, conserved
electric charge density	ρ_{Q}	Electric charge per unit volume	C/m^{3}	L^{−3} T I	intensive
electrical conductance	G	Measure for how easily current flows through a material	siemens (S = Ω^{−1})	M^{−1} L^{−2} T^{3} I^{2}	
electrical conductivity	σ	Measure of a material's ability to conduct an electric current	S/m	M^{−1} L^{−3} T^{3} I^{2}	
electric current	I	Rate of flow of electrical charge per unit time	ampere (A)	I	ISQ base quantity, extensive
electric potential	φ	Energy required to move a unit charge through an electric field from a reference point	volt (V = J/C)	M L^{2} T^{−3} I^{−1}	extensive
electrical resistance	R	Electric potential per unit electric current	ohm (Ω = V/A)	M L^{2} T^{−3} I^{−2}	extensive, assumes linearity
electrical resistivity	ρ_{e}	Bulk property equivalent of electrical resistance	ohm-metre (Ω⋅m)	M L^{3} T^{−3} I^{−2}	extensive, conserved
energy	E	Energy	joule (J)	M L^{2} T^{−2}	
energy density	U	Energy per volume	J⋅m^{−3}	M L^{−1} T^{−2}	intensive
entropy	S	Logarithmic measure of the number of available states of a system	J/K	M L^{2} T^{−2} Θ^{−1}	extensive
frequency	f	Number of (periodic) occurrences per unit time	hertz (Hz = s^{−1})	T^{−1}	
half-life	t_{1/2}	Time for a quantity to decay to half its initial value	s	T	
heat	Q	Heat	joule (J)	M L^{2} T^{−2}	
heat capacity	C_{p}	Energy per unit temperature change	J/K	M L^{2} T^{−2} Θ^{−1}	extensive
heat flux density	ϕ_{Q}	Heat flow per unit time per unit surface area	W/m^{2}	M T^{−3}	
illuminance	E_{v}	Wavelength-weighted luminous flux per unit surface area	lux (lx = cd⋅sr/m^{2})	L^{−2} J	intensive
impedance	Z	Resistance to an alternating current of a given frequency, including effect on phase	ohm (Ω)	M L^{2} T^{−3} I^{−2}	complex scalar
inductance	L	Magnetic flux generated per unit current through a circuit	henry (H)	M L^{2} T^{−2} I^{−2}	
irradiance	E	Electromagnetic radiation power per unit surface area	W/m^{2}	M T^{−3}	intensive
intensity	I	Power per unit cross sectional area	W/m^{2}	M T^{−3}	intensive
kinetic energy	KE	The work or force in the direction of motion times displacement	joule (J)	M L^{2} T^{−2}	extensive
length	l, L	linear extent between two points, which may be along some path	metre (m)	L	ISQ base quantity, extensive
linear density	ρ_{l}	Mass per unit length	kg⋅m^{−1}	M L^{−1}	
luminous intensity	I_{v}	Wavelength-weighted power of emitted light per unit solid angle	candela (cd)	J	ISQ base quantity
luminous flux (or luminous power)	F	Perceived power of a light source	lumen (lm = cd⋅sr)	J	extensive
Mach number (or mach)	M	Ratio of flow velocity to the local speed of sound	1	1	intensive
magnetic flux	Φ	Measure of magnetism, taking account of the strength and the extent of a magnetic field	weber (Wb)	M L^{2} T^{−2} I^{−1}	
mass	m	A measure of resistance to acceleration	kilogram (kg)	M	ISQ base quantity, extensive
mass fraction	x	Mass of a substance as a fraction of the total mass	1	1	intensive
mean lifetime	τ	Average time for a particle of a substance to decay	s	T	intensive
molar concentration	C	Amount of substance per unit volume	mol⋅m^{−3}	L^{−3} N	intensive
molar energy		Amount of energy present in a system per unit amount of substance	J/mol	M L^{2} T^{−2} N^{−1}	intensive
molar entropy	S°	Entropy per unit amount of substance	J/(K⋅mol)	M L^{2} T^{−2} Θ^{−1} N^{−1}	intensive
molar heat capacity	c	Heat capacity of a material per unit amount of substance	J/(K⋅mol)	M L^{2} T^{−2} Θ^{−1} N^{−1}	intensive
moment of inertia	I	Inertia of an object with respect to angular acceleration	kg⋅m^{2}	M L^{2}	extensive, tensor, scalar
optical power	P	Measure of the effective curvature of a lens or curved mirror; inverse of focal length	dioptre (dpt = m^{−1})	L^{−1}	intensive
permeability	μ_{s}	Measure for how the magnetization of material is affected by the application of an external magnetic field	H/m	M L T^{−2} I^{−2}	intensive
permittivity	ε_{s}	Measure for how the polarization of a material is affected by the application of an external electric field	F/m	M^{−1} L^{−3} T^{4} I^{2}	intensive
plane angle	θ	Ratio of circular arc length to radius	radian (rad)	1	intensive
potential energy	PE	The energy of an object or system due to the body's position relative to other objects, or the configuration of its particles	joule (J)	M L^{2} T^{−2}	
power	P	Rate of transfer of energy per unit time	watt (W)	M L^{2} T^{−3}	extensive
pressure	p	Force per unit area	pascal (Pa = N/m^{2})	M L^{−1} T^{−2}	intensive
(radioactivity) activity	A	Number of particles decaying per unit time	becquerel (Bq = Hz)	T^{−1}	extensive
(radiation) dose	D	Ionizing radiation energy absorbed per unit mass	gray (Gy = J/kg)	L^{2} T^{−2}	
radiance	L	Power of emitted electromagnetic radiation per unit solid angle per emitting source area	W/(m^{2}⋅sr)	M T^{−3}	
radiant intensity	I	Power of emitted electromagnetic radiation per unit solid angle	W/sr	M L^{2} T^{−3}	
reaction rate	r	Rate of a chemical reaction for unit time	mol/(m^{3}⋅s)	L^{−3} T^{−1} N	intensive
refractive index	n	Factor by which the phase velocity of light is reduced in a medium	1	1	intensive
reluctance	$\mathcal{R}$	Resistance to the flow of magnetic flux	H^{−1}	M^{−1} L^{−2} T^{2} I^{2}	
solid angle	Ω	Ratio of area on a sphere to its radius squared	steradian (sr)	1	intensive
specific energy	e	Energy density per unit mass	J⋅kg^{−1}	L^{2} T^{−2}	intensive
specific heat capacity	c	Heat capacity per unit mass	J/(K⋅kg)	L^{2} T^{−2} Θ^{−1}	intensive
specific volume	v	Volume per unit mass (reciprocal of density)	m^{3}⋅kg^{−1}	M^{−1} L^{3}	intensive
speed	v	magnitude of velocity	m/s	L T^{−1}	intensive
spin	S	Quantum-mechanically defined angular momentum of a particle	kg⋅m^{2}⋅s^{−1}	M L^{2} T^{−1}	
strain	ε	Extension per unit length	1	1	intensive
stress	σ	Force per unit oriented surface area	Pa	M L^{−1} T^{−2}	order 2 tensor
surface tension	γ	Energy change per unit change in surface area	N/m or J/m^{2}	M T^{−2}	
temperature	T	Average kinetic energy per degree of freedom of a system	kelvin (K)	Θ	ISQ base quantity, intensive
time	t	The duration of an event	second (s)	T	ISQ base quantity, extensive
thermal conductance	κ, λ	Measure for the ease with which an object conducts heat	W/K	M L^{2} T^{−3} Θ^{−1}	extensive
thermal conductivity	λ	Measure for the ease with which a material conducts heat	W/(m⋅K)	M L T^{−3} Θ^{−1}	intensive
Thermal resistance	R	Measure for the ease with which an object resists conduction of heat	K/W	M^{−1} L^{−2} T^{3} Θ	extensive
Thermal resistivity	R_{λ}	Measure for the ease with which a material resists conduction of heat	K⋅m/W	M^{−1} L^{−1} T^{3} Θ	intensive
viscosity	η	The measure of the internal friction in a fluid	Pa⋅s	M L^{−1} T^{−1}	intensive
volume	V	Three dimensional extent of an object	m^{3}	L^{3}	extensive
volumetric flow rate	Q	Rate of change of volume with respect to time	m^{3}⋅s^{−1}	L^{3} T^{−1}	extensive
wavelength	λ	length of the repetition interval of a wave as measured in the direction of propagation	m	L	
wavenumber	k	Repetency or spatial frequency: the inverse of the wavelength	m^{−1}	L^{−1}	intensive
work	W	Transferred energy	joule (J)	M L^{2} T^{−2}	
Young's modulus	E	Ratio of stress to strain	pascal (Pa)	M L^{−1} T^{−2}	scalar; assumes isotropic linear material
spring constant	k	k is the torsional constant (measured in N·m/rad), which characterizes the stiffness of the torsional spring or the resistance to angular displacement.	N/m	M T^{−2}	

== Vector ==
Vector quantities
Name	Symbol	Description	SI unit	Quantity dimension	Comments
absement	A	Measure of sustained displacement: the first integral with respect to time of displacement	m⋅s	L T	
acceleration	a→	Rate of change of velocity per unit time: the second time derivative of position	m/s^{2}	L T^{−2}	vector
angular acceleration	ω_{a}	Change in angular velocity per unit time	rad/s^{2}	T^{−2}	pseudovector
angular momentum	L	Measure of the extent and direction an object rotates about a reference point	kg⋅m^{2}/s	M L^{2} T^{−1}	conserved, bivector
angular velocity	ω	The angle incremented in a plane by a segment connecting an object and a reference point per unit time	rad/s	T^{−1}	bivector
area	A	Extent of a surface	m^{2}	L^{2}	extensive, bivector or scalar
centrifugal force	F_{c}	Inertial force that appears to act on all objects when viewed in a rotating frame of reference	N⋅rad = kg⋅m⋅rad⋅s^{−2}	M L T^{−2}	bivector
crackle	c→	Change of snap per unit time: the fifth time derivative of position	m/s^{5}	L T^{−5}	
current density	J→	Electric current per unit cross-section area	A/m^{2}	L^{−2} I	conserved, intensive
displacement	∆s→	The shortest distance from the initial to the final position of a point P undergoing motion	m	L	extensive
electric dipole moment	p	Measure of the separation of equal and opposite electric charges	C⋅m	L T I	
electric displacement field	D→	Strength of the electric displacement	C/m^{2}	L^{−2} T I	vector field
electric field strength	E→	Strength of the electric field	V/m, N/C	M L T^{−3} I^{−1}	vector field
force	F→	Transfer of momentum per unit time	newton (N = kg⋅m⋅s^{−2})	M L T^{−2}	extensive
gravitational field strength	g→	Force per unit mass in a gravitational field	m/s^{2}	L T^{−2}	
impulse	J	Transferred momentum	newton-second (N⋅s = kg⋅m/s)	M L T^{−1}	
jerk	j→	Change of acceleration per unit time: the third time derivative of position	m/s^{3}	L T^{−3}	
magnetic field strength	H	Strength of a magnetic field	A/m	L^{−1} I	
magnetic flux density	B	Measure for the strength of the magnetic field	tesla (T = Wb/m^{2})	M T^{−2} I^{−1}	pseudovector
magnetic moment (or magnetic dipole moment)	m	The component of magnetic strength and orientation that can be represented by an equivalent magnetic dipole	N⋅m/T	L^{2} I	
magnetization	M	Amount of magnetic moment per unit volume	A/m	L^{−1} I	vector field
momentum	p→	Product of an object's mass and velocity	kg⋅m/s	M L T^{−1}	extensive
pop	p→	Rate of change of crackle per unit time: the sixth time derivative of position	m/s^{6}	L T^{−6}	
pressure gradient	∇p	Pressure per unit distance	pascal per metre (Pa/m)	M^{1} L^{−2} T^{−2}	
snap (or jounce)	s→	Change of jerk per unit time: the fourth time derivative of position	m/s^{4}	L T^{−4}	
temperature gradient	∇T	Steepest rate of temperature change at a particular location	K/m	L^{−1} Θ	
torque	τ	Product of a force and the perpendicular distance of the force from the point about which it is exerted	newton-metre (N⋅m)	M L^{2} T^{−2}	bivector (or pseudovector in 3D)
velocity	v→	Moved distance per unit time: the first time derivative of position	m/s	L T^{−1}	
wavevector	k→	Repetency or spatial frequency vector: the number of cycles per unit distance	m^{−1}	L^{−1}	
weight	w	Gravitational force on an object	newton (N = kg⋅m/s^{2})	M L T^{−2}	

== Tensor ==
Tensor quantities
Name	Symbol	Description	SI unit	Quantity dimension	Comments
moment of inertia	I	Inertia of an object with respect to angular acceleration	kg⋅m^{2}	L^{2} M	extensive, tensor, scalar
stress	σ	Force per unit oriented surface area	Pa	L^{−1} M T^{−2}	order 2 tensor
electric susceptibility (for non-isotropic linear dielectrics)	χ	Polarization density per unit electric field	1	1	tensor, scalar

== See also ==
- List of photometric quantities
- List of radiometric quantities
- List of dimensionless quantities
- List of electromagnetism quantities
