= Base unit =

Base unit may refer to:

- Base unit (measurement), in physics, a unit of measurement from which derived units may be compounded
  - SI base unit, a base unit in the SI system
- An administrative unit of the United States Army Air Forces
