= Physical quantity =

Measurable property of a material or system

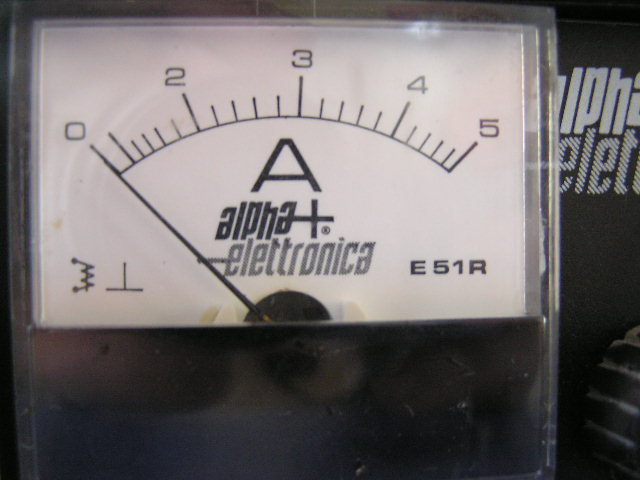
Ampèremetre (Ammeter)

A physical quantity (or simply quantity) (Note: "The concept 'quantity' may be generically divided into, e.g. 'physical quantity', 'chemical quantity', and 'biological quantity', or 'base quantity' and 'derived quantity'.") is a property of a material or system that can be quantified by measurement. A physical quantity can be expressed as a value, which is a pair of a numerical value and a unit of measurement. For example, the physical quantity mass, symbol m, can be quantified as m=n kg, where n is the numerical value and kg is the unit symbol (for kilogram). Vector quantities have, besides numerical value and unit, direction or orientation in space.

== Principles ==
=== Dimensions ===
The notion of dimension of a physical quantity was introduced by Joseph Fourier in 1822. By convention, physical quantities are organized in a dimensional system built upon base quantities, each of which is regarded as having its own dimension. The dimension of a quantity Z is denoted dim Z or dim(Z).

=== Kind ===
Some physical quantities are commensurable, meaning that they can be added, subtracted, and compared with one another. To be commensurable, quantities must have the same dimension, but this alone is not sufficient; the quantities must also be the same kind. For example, both kinematic viscosity and thermal diffusivity have dimension of square length per time (units of m^{2}/s), but they are not commensurable. Quantities of the same kind share extra commonalities beyond their dimension and units allowing their comparison.

=== Unit ===
There is often a choice of unit, though SI units are usually used in scientific contexts due to their ease of use, international familiarity and prescription. For example, a quantity of mass might be represented by the symbol m, and could be expressed in the units kilograms (kg), pounds (lb), or daltons (Da). The unit of a quantity Z is denoted [Z].

=== Value ===
Following ISO 80000-1, any value of a physical quantity Z is expressed as the product of a numerical value {Z} (a pure number) and a unit [Z]:

$$Z = \{Z\} \times [Z]$$

The value is sometimes called denominate number or magnitude (although "magnitude" typically refers to the absolute value or vector norm). For example, let $Z$ be "2 metres"; then, $\{Z\} = 2$ is the numerical value and $[Z] = \mathrm{metre}$ is the unit. Conversely, the numerical value expressed in an arbitrary unit can be obtained as:

$$\{Z\} = Z / [Z]$$

The multiplication sign is usually left out, just as it is left out between variables in the scientific notation of formulas. The convention used to express quantities is referred to as quantity calculus. In formulas, the unit [Z] can be treated as if it were a specific magnitude of a kind of physical dimension: see Dimensional analysis for more on this treatment.

=== Typography ===
International recommendations for the use of symbols for quantities are set out in ISO/IEC 80000, the IUPAP red book and the IUPAC green book. For example, the recommended symbol for the physical quantity "mass" is m, and the recommended symbol for the quantity "electric charge" is Q.

Physical quantities are normally typeset in italics. Purely numerical quantities, even those denoted by letters, are usually printed in roman (upright) type, though sometimes in italics. Symbols for elementary functions (circular trigonometric, hyperbolic, logarithmic etc.), changes in a quantity like Δ in Δy or operators like d in dx, are also recommended to be printed in roman type.

Examples:

- Real numbers, such as 1 or √2,
- e, the base of natural logarithms,
- i, the imaginary unit,
- π for the ratio of a circle's circumference to its diameter, 3.14159265...
- δx, Δy, dz, representing differences (finite or otherwise) in the quantities x, y and z
- sin α, sinh γ, log x

== Support ==
=== Scalars ===
A scalar is a physical quantity that has magnitude but no direction. Symbols for physical quantities are usually chosen to be a single letter of the Latin or Greek alphabet, and are printed in italic type.

=== Vectors ===
Vectors are physical quantities that possess both magnitude and direction and whose operations obey the axioms of a vector space. Symbols for physical quantities that are vectors are in bold type, underlined or with an arrow above. For example, if u is the speed of a particle, then the straightforward notations for its velocity are u, u, or $\vec{u}$.

=== Tensors ===
Scalar and vector quantities are the simplest tensor quantities, which are tensors that can be used to describe more general physical properties. For example, the Cauchy stress tensor possesses magnitude, direction, and orientation qualities.

== Systems of quantities ==
A system of quantities relates different physical quantities.

=== Base quantities ===
A limited number of quantities can serve as a basis in terms of which the dimensions of all the remaining quantities of the system can be defined. A set of mutually independent quantities may be chosen by convention to act as such a set, and are called base quantities.

The seven base quantities of the International System of Quantities (ISQ) and their corresponding SI units and dimensions are listed in the following table. Other conventions may have a different number of base units (e.g. the CGS and MKS systems of units).

International System of Quantities base quantities
Quantity		SI unit		Dimension symbol
Name(s)	(Common) symbol(s)	Name	Symbol	Dimension symbol
Length	l, x, r	metre	m	L
Time	t	second	s	T
Mass	m	kilogram	kg	M
Thermodynamic temperature	T	kelvin	K	Θ
Amount of substance	n	mole	mol	N
Electric current	i, I	ampere	A	I
Luminous intensity	I_{v}	candela	cd	J

The angular quantities, plane angle and solid angle, are defined as derived dimensionless quantities in the SI. For some relations, their units radian and steradian can be written explicitly to emphasize the fact that the quantity involves plane or solid angles.

=== Derived quantities ===
Derived quantities are those whose definitions are based on other physical quantities (base quantities). There are many ISQ derived quantities.

==== Space ====
Important applied base units for space and time are below. Area and volume are thus, of course, derived from the length, but included for completeness as they occur frequently in many derived quantities, in particular densities.

Quantity		SI unit	Dimensions
Description	Symbols	SI unit	Dimensions
(Spatial) position (vector)	**r**, **R**, **a**, **d**	m	L
Angular position, angle of rotation (can be treated as vector or scalar)	θ, **θ**	rad	None
Area, cross-section	A, S, Ω	m^{2}	L^{2}
Vector area (Magnitude of surface area, directed normal to tangential plane of surface)	$\mathbf{A} \equiv A\mathbf{\hat{n}}, \quad \mathbf{S}\equiv S\mathbf{\hat{n}}$	m^{2}	L^{2}
Volume	τ, V	m^{3}	L^{3}

==== Densities, flows, gradients, and moments ====
Important and convenient derived quantities such as densities, fluxes, flows, currents are associated with many quantities. Sometimes different terms such as current density and flux density, rate, frequency and current, are used interchangeably in the same context; sometimes they are used uniquely.

To clarify these effective template-derived quantities, we use q to stand for any quantity within some scope of context (not necessarily base quantities) and present in the table below some of the most commonly used symbols where applicable, their definitions, usage, SI units and SI dimensions – where [q] denotes the dimension of q.

For time derivatives, specific, molar, and flux densities of quantities, there is no one symbol; nomenclature depends on the subject, though time derivatives can be generally written using overdot notation. For generality we use q_{m}, q_{n}, and F respectively. No symbol is necessarily required for the gradient of a scalar field, since only the nabla/del operator ∇ or grad needs to be written. For spatial density, current, current density and flux, the notations are common from one context to another, differing only by a change in subscripts.

For current density, $\mathbf{\hat{t}}$ is a unit vector in the direction of flow, i.e. tangent to a flowline. Notice the dot product with the unit normal for a surface, since the amount of current passing through the surface is reduced when the current is not normal to the area. Only the current passing perpendicular to the surface contributes to the current passing through the surface, no current passes in the (tangential) plane of the surface.

The calculus notations below can be used synonymously.

If X is a n-variable function $X \equiv X \left ( x_1, x_2 \cdots x_n \right )$, then

Differential The differential n-dimensional volume element is $\mathrm{d}^n x \equiv \mathrm{d} V_n \equiv \mathrm{d} x_1 \mathrm{d} x_2 \cdots \mathrm{d} x_n$,

Integral: The multiple integral of X over the n-dimensional volume is $\int X \mathrm{d}^n x \equiv \int X \mathrm{d} V_n \equiv \int \cdots \int \int X \mathrm{d} x_1 \mathrm{d} x_2 \cdots \mathrm{d} x_n$.

Quantity	Typical symbols	Definition	Meaning, usage	Dimensions
Quantity	q	q	Amount of a property	[q]
Rate of change of quantity, time derivative	$\dot{q}$	$\dot{q} \equiv \frac{\mathrm{d} q}{\mathrm{d} t}$	Rate of change of property with respect to time	[q]T^{−1}
Quantity spatial density	ρ = volume density (n = 3), σ = surface density (n = 2), λ = linear density (n = 1) No common symbol for n-dimensional density, here ρ_{n} is used.	$q = \int \rho_n \mathrm{d} V_n$	Amount of property per unit n-volume (length, area, volume or higher dimensions)	[q]L^{−n}
Specific quantity	q_{m}	$q_m = \frac{\mathrm{d} q}{\mathrm{d} m}$	Amount of property per unit mass	[q]M^{−1}
Molar quantity	q_{n}	$q_n = \frac{\mathrm{d} q}{\mathrm{d} n}$	Amount of property per mole of substance	[q]N^{−1}
Quantity gradient (if q is a scalar field).		$\nabla q$	Rate of change of property with respect to position	[q]L^{−1}
Spectral quantity (for EM waves)	q_{v}, q_{ν}, q_{λ}	Two definitions are used, for frequency and wavelength: $q=\int q_\lambda \mathrm{d} \lambda$ $q=\int q_\nu \mathrm{d} \nu$	Amount of property per unit wavelength or frequency.	[q]L^{−1} (q_{λ}) [q]T (q_{ν})
Flux, flow (synonymous)	Φ_{F}, F	Two definitions are used: Transport mechanics, nuclear physics/particle physics: $q = \iiint F \mathrm{d} A \mathrm{d} t$ Vector field: $\Phi_F = \iint_S \mathbf{F} \cdot \mathrm{d} \mathbf{A}$	Flow of a property though a cross-section/surface boundary.	[q]T^{−1}L^{−2}, [F]L^{2}
Flux density	**F**	$\mathbf{F} \cdot \mathbf{\hat{n}} = \frac{\mathrm{d} \Phi_F}{\mathrm{d} A}$	Flow of a property though a cross-section/surface boundary per unit cross-section/surface area	[F]
Current	i, I	$I = \frac{\mathrm{d} q}{\mathrm{d} t}$	Rate of flow of property through a cross-section/surface boundary	[q]T^{−1}
Current density (sometimes called flux density in transport mechanics)	**j**, **J**	$I = \iint \mathbf{J} \cdot \mathrm{d}\mathbf{S}$	Rate of flow of property per unit cross-section/surface area	[q]T^{−1}L^{−2}
Moment of quantity	**m**, **M**	k-vector q: $\mathbf{m} = \mathbf{r} \wedge q$: scalar q: $\mathbf{m} = \mathbf{r} q$; 3D vector **q**, equivalently (Note: via Hodge duality) $\mathbf{m} = \mathbf{r} \times \mathbf{q}$	Quantity at position **r** has a moment about a point or axes, often relates to tendency of rotation or potential energy.	[q]L

== See also ==
- List of physical quantities
- List of photometric quantities
- List of radiometric quantities
- Philosophy of science
- Quantity
  - Observable quantity
  - Specific quantity
  - Level (logarithmic quantity)
