= SI derived unit =

Measurement unit derived from basic metric value

SI derived units are units of measurement derived from the seven SI base units specified by the International System of Units (SI). They can be expressed as a product (or ratio) of one or more of the base units, possibly scaled by an appropriate power of exponentiation (see: Buckingham π theorem). Some are dimensionless, as when the units cancel out in ratios of like quantities.

SI coherent derived units involve only a trivial proportionality factor, not requiring conversion factors.

The SI has special names for 22 of these coherent derived units (for example, hertz, the SI unit of measurement of frequency), but the rest merely reflect their derivation: for example, the square metre (m^{2}), the SI derived unit of area; and the kilogram per cubic metre (kg/m^{3} or kg⋅m^{−3}), the SI derived unit of density.

The names of SI coherent derived units, when written in full, are always in lowercase. However, the symbols for units named after persons are written with an uppercase initial letter. For example, the symbol for hertz is "Hz", while the symbol for metre is "m".

== Special names ==
The International System of Units assigns special names to 22 derived units, which includes two dimensionless units, the radian (rad) and the steradian (sr).

Named units derived from SI base units
Name	Symbol	Quantity	Equivalents	SI base unit equivalents
hertz	Hz	frequency	1/s	s^{−1}
radian	rad	angle	m/m	1
steradian	sr	solid angle	m^{2}/m^{2}	1
newton	N	force, weight	kg⋅m/s^{2}	kg⋅m⋅s^{−2}
pascal	Pa	pressure, stress	N/m^{2}	kg⋅m^{−1}⋅s^{−2}
joule	J	energy, work, heat	m⋅N, C⋅V, W⋅s	kg⋅m^{2}⋅s^{−2}
watt	W	power, radiant flux	J/s, V⋅A	kg⋅m^{2}⋅s^{−3}
coulomb	C	electric charge	A⋅s, F⋅V	s⋅A
volt	V	voltage, electric potential, electromotive force	J/C, W/A	kg⋅m^{2}⋅s^{−3}⋅A^{−1}
ohm	Ω	electrical resistance, reactance, impedance	V/A, 1/S	kg⋅m^{2}⋅s^{−3}⋅A^{−2}
siemens	S	electrical conductance, susceptance, admittance	A/V, 1/Ω	kg^{−1}⋅m^{−2}⋅s^{3}⋅A^{2}
farad	F	capacitance	C/V, s/Ω	kg^{−1}⋅m^{−2}⋅s^{4}⋅A^{2}
henry	H	inductance, permeance	V⋅s/A, Wb/A, Ω⋅s	kg⋅m^{2}⋅s^{−2}⋅A^{−2}
tesla	T	magnetic flux density	N/(A⋅m), Wb/m^{2}, V⋅s/m^{2}	kg⋅s^{−2}⋅A^{−1}
weber	Wb	magnetic flux, flux linkage	V⋅s, T⋅m^{2}, J/A	kg⋅m^{2}⋅s^{−2}⋅A^{−1}
degree Celsius	°C	temperature relative to 273.15 K	K	K
lumen	lm	luminous flux	cd⋅sr	cd
lux	lx	illuminance	lm/m^{2}	cd⋅m^{−2}
becquerel	Bq	radioactivity (decays per unit time)	1/s	s^{−1}
gray	Gy	absorbed dose (of ionizing radiation)	J/kg	m^{2}⋅s^{−2}
sievert	Sv	equivalent dose (of ionizing radiation)	J/kg	m^{2}⋅s^{−2}
katal	kat	catalytic activity	mol/s	s^{−1}⋅mol.

== By field of application ==
=== Kinematics ===
Name	Symbol	Quantity	Expression in terms of SI base units
metre per second	m/s	speed, velocity	m⋅s^{−1}
metre per second squared	m/s^{2}	acceleration	m⋅s^{−2}
metre per second cubed	m/s^{3}	jerk, jolt	m⋅s^{−3}
metre per second to the fourth	m/s^{4}	snap, jounce	m⋅s^{−4}
kilogram metre per second to the third	kg⋅m/s^{3}	yank	m⋅kg⋅s^{−3}
radian per second	rad/s	angular velocity	s^{−1}
radian per second squared	rad/s^{2}	angular acceleration	s^{−2}
hertz per second	Hz/s	frequency drift	s^{−2}
cubic metre per second	m^{3}/s	volumetric flow	m^{3}⋅s^{−1}

=== Mechanics ===
Name	Symbol	Quantity	Expression in terms of SI base units
square metre	m^{2}	area	m^{2}
cubic metre	m^{3}	volume	m^{3}
newton-second	N⋅s	momentum, impulse	m⋅kg⋅s^{−1}
newton metre second	N⋅m⋅s	angular momentum	m^{2}⋅kg⋅s^{−1}
newton-metre	N⋅m = J/rad	torque, moment of force	m^{2}⋅kg⋅s^{−2}
newton per second	N/s	yank	m⋅kg⋅s^{−3}
reciprocal metre	m^{−1}	wavenumber, optical power, curvature, spatial frequency	m^{−1}
kilogram per square metre	kg/m^{2}	area density	m^{−2}⋅kg
kilogram per cubic metre	kg/m^{3}	density, mass density	m^{−3}⋅kg
cubic metre per kilogram	m^{3}/kg	specific volume	m^{3}⋅kg^{−1}
joule-second	J⋅s	action	m^{2}⋅kg⋅s^{−1}
joule per kilogram	J/kg	specific energy	m^{2}⋅s^{−2}
joule per cubic metre	J/m^{3}	energy density	m^{−1}⋅kg⋅s^{−2}
newton per metre	N/m = J/m^{2}	surface tension, stiffness	kg⋅s^{−2}
watt per square metre	W/m^{2}	heat flux density, irradiance	kg⋅s^{−3}
square metre per second	m^{2}/s	kinematic viscosity, thermal diffusivity, diffusion coefficient	m^{2}⋅s^{−1}
pascal-second	Pa⋅s = N⋅s/m^{2}	dynamic viscosity	m^{−1}⋅kg⋅s^{−1}
kilogram per metre	kg/m	linear mass density	m^{−1}⋅kg
kilogram per second	kg/s	mass flow rate	kg⋅s^{−1}
watt per steradian square metre	W/(sr⋅m^{2})	radiance	kg⋅s^{−3}
watt per steradian cubic metre	W/(sr⋅m^{3})	radiance	m^{−1}⋅kg⋅s^{−3}
watt per metre	W/m	spectral power	m⋅kg⋅s^{−3}
gray per second	Gy/s	absorbed dose rate	m^{2}⋅s^{−3}
metre per cubic metre	m/m^{3}	fuel efficiency	m^{−2}
watt per cubic metre	W/m^{3}	spectral irradiance, power density	m^{−1}⋅kg⋅s^{−3}
joule per square metre second	J/(m^{2}⋅s)	energy flux density	kg⋅s^{−3}
reciprocal pascal	Pa^{−1}	compressibility	m⋅kg^{−1}⋅s^{2}
joule per square metre	J/m^{2}	radiant exposure	kg⋅s^{−2}
kilogram square metre	kg⋅m^{2}	moment of inertia	m^{2}⋅kg
newton metre second per kilogram	N⋅m⋅s/kg	specific angular momentum	m^{2}⋅s^{−1}
watt per steradian	W/sr	radiant intensity	m^{2}⋅kg⋅s^{−3}
watt per steradian metre	W/(sr⋅m)	spectral intensity	m⋅kg⋅s^{−3}

=== Chemistry ===
Name	Symbol	Quantity	Expression in terms of SI base units
mole per cubic metre	mol/m^{3}	molarity, amount of substance concentration	m^{−3}⋅mol
cubic metre per mole	m^{3}/mol	molar volume	m^{3}⋅mol^{−1}
joule per kelvin mole	J/(K⋅mol)	molar heat capacity, molar entropy	m^{2}⋅kg⋅s^{−2}⋅K^{−1}⋅mol^{−1}
joule per mole	J/mol	molar energy	m^{2}⋅kg⋅s^{−2}⋅mol^{−1}
siemens square metre per mole	S⋅m^{2}/mol	molar conductivity	kg^{−1}⋅s^{3}⋅A^{2}⋅mol^{−1}
mole per kilogram	mol/kg	molality	kg^{−1}⋅mol
kilogram per mole	kg/mol	molar mass	kg⋅mol^{−1}
cubic metre per mole second	m^{3}/(mol⋅s)	catalytic efficiency	m^{3}⋅s^{−1}⋅mol^{−1}

=== Electromagnetics ===
Name	Symbol	Quantity	Expression in terms of SI base units
coulomb per metre	C/m	linear charge density	m^{−1}⋅s⋅A
coulomb per square metre	C/m^{2}	surface charge density, polarization density, electric flux density	m^{−2}⋅s⋅A
coulomb per cubic metre	C/m^{3}	volume charge density	m^{−3}⋅s⋅A
ampere per metre	A/m	magnetization, magnetic field strength	m^{−1}⋅A
ampere per square metre	A/m^{2}	current density	m^{−2}⋅A
volt per metre	V/m	electric field	m⋅kg⋅s^{−3}⋅A^{−1}
siemens per metre	S/m	electrical conductivity	m^{−3}⋅kg^{−1}⋅s^{3}⋅A^{2}
farad per metre	F/m	permittivity	m^{−3}⋅kg^{−1}⋅s^{4}⋅A^{2}
henry per metre	H/m	permeability	m⋅kg⋅s^{−2}⋅A^{−2}
weber per metre	Wb/m	magnetic vector potential	m⋅kg⋅s^{−2}⋅A^{−1}
coulomb-metre	C⋅m	electric dipole moment	m⋅s⋅A
ampere square metre	A⋅m^{2}	magnetic moment	m^{2}⋅A
volt-metre	V⋅m	electric flux	m^{3}⋅kg⋅s^{−3}⋅A^{−1}
ohm-metre	Ω⋅m	electrical resistivity	m^{3}⋅kg⋅s^{−3}⋅A^{−2}
tesla-metre	T⋅m	magnetic rigidity	m⋅kg⋅s^{−2}⋅A^{−1}
reciprocal henry	H^{−1}	magnetic reluctance	m^{−2}⋅kg^{−1}⋅s^{2}⋅A^{2}
volt-ampere	V⋅A	complex power, apparent power	m^{2}⋅kg⋅s^{−3}
square metre per volt-second	m^{2}/(V⋅s)	electron mobility	kg^{−1}⋅s^{2}⋅A
coulomb per kilogram	C/kg	exposure (X and gamma rays)	kg^{−1}⋅s⋅A

=== Photometry ===
Name	Symbol	Quantity	Expression in terms of SI base units
lumen second	lm⋅s	luminous energy	s⋅cd
lux second	lx⋅s	luminous exposure	m^{−2}⋅s⋅cd
candela per square metre	cd/m^{2}	luminance	m^{−2}⋅cd
lumen per watt	lm/W	luminous efficacy	m^{−2}⋅kg^{−1}⋅s^{3}⋅cd

=== Thermodynamics ===
Name	Symbol	Quantity	Expression in terms of SI base units
joule per kelvin	J/K	heat capacity, entropy	m^{2}⋅kg⋅s^{−2}⋅K^{−1}
joule per kilogram kelvin	J/(K⋅kg)	specific heat capacity, specific entropy	m^{2}⋅s^{−2}⋅K^{−1}
watt per metre kelvin	W/(m⋅K)	thermal conductivity	m⋅kg⋅s^{−3}⋅K^{−1}
kelvin per watt	K/W	thermal resistance	m^{−2}⋅kg^{−1}⋅s^{3}⋅K
reciprocal kelvin	K^{−1}	thermal expansion coefficient	K^{−1}
kelvin per metre	K/m	temperature gradient	m^{−1}⋅K

== Other units used with SI ==
Some other units such as the hour, litre, tonne, bar, and electronvolt are not SI units, but are widely used in conjunction with SI units.

== Supplementary units ==
Until 1995, the SI classified the radian and the steradian as supplementary units, but this designation was abandoned and the units were grouped as derived units.

== See also ==
- Coherent derived unit
- International System of Quantities (ISQ)
- International Vocabulary of Metrology
- List of physical quantities
- Metric prefix
- Metric system
- Unit multiple

== Bibliography ==
- I. Mills, Tomislav Cvitas, Klaus Homann, Nikola Kallay, IUPAC (June 1993). Quantities, Units and Symbols in Physical Chemistry (2nd ed.). Blackwell Science Inc. p. 72.
