= Quantity calculus =

Mathematical relations between abstract physical quantities

Quantity calculus is the formal method for describing the mathematical relations between abstract physical quantities. (Note: Here the term calculus should be understood in its broader sense of "a system of computation", rather than in the sense of differential calculus and integral calculus.)

Its roots can be traced to Fourier's concept of dimensional analysis (1822). The basic axiom of quantity calculus is Maxwell's description of a physical quantity as the product of a "numerical value" and a "reference quantity" (i.e. a "unit quantity" or a "unit of measurement"). De Boer summarized the multiplication, division, addition, association and commutation rules of quantity calculus and proposed that a full axiomatization has yet to be completed.

Measurements are expressed as products of a numeric value with a unit symbol, e.g. "12.7 m". Unlike algebra, the unit symbol represents a measurable quantity such as a metre, not an algebraic variable i.e. the unit symbol does not satisfy the axioms of arithmetic.

A careful distinction needs to be made between abstract quantities and measurable quantities. The multiplication and division rules of quantity calculus are applied to SI base units (which are measurable quantities) to define SI derived units, including dimensionless derived units, such as the radian (rad) and steradian (sr) which are useful for clarity, although they are both algebraically equal to 1. Thus there is some disagreement about whether it is meaningful to multiply or divide units. Emerson suggests that if the units of a quantity are algebraically simplified, they then are no longer units of that quantity. Johansson proposes that there are logical flaws in the application of quantity calculus, and that the so-called dimensionless quantities should be understood as "unitless quantities".

How to use quantity calculus for unit conversion and keeping track of units in algebraic manipulations is explained in the handbook Quantities, Units and Symbols in Physical Chemistry.
