= Vector quantity =

Physical quantity that is a vector

In the natural sciences, a vector quantity (also known as a vector physical quantity, physical vector, or simply vector) is a vector-valued physical quantity. It is typically formulated as the product of a unit of measurement and a vector numerical value (unitless), often a Euclidean vector with magnitude and direction. For example, a position vector in physical space may be expressed as three Cartesian coordinates with SI unit of meters.

In physics and engineering, particularly in mechanics, a physical vector may be endowed with additional structure compared to a geometrical vector. A bound vector (sometimes called a bounded vector, formerly known as located vector) is defined as the combination of an ordinary vector quantity and a point of application or point of action. Bound vector quantities are formulated as a directed line segment, with a definite initial point besides the magnitude and direction of the main vector. For example, a force on the Euclidean plane has two Cartesian components in SI unit of newtons (describing the magnitude and direction of the force) and an accompanying two-dimensional position vector in meters (describing the point of application of the force), for a total of four numbers on the plane (and six in space). A simpler example of a bound vector is the translation vector from an initial point to an end point; in this case, the bound vector is an ordered pair of points in the same position space, with all coordinates having the same quantity dimension and unit (length and meters). A sliding vector is the combination of an ordinary vector quantity and a line of application or line of action, over which the vector quantity can be translated (without rotations). A free vector is a vector quantity having an undefined point or region of application. It can be freely translated with no consequences as it does not depend on a particular coordinate system. A displacement vector is a prototypical example of free vector.

Aside from the notion of units and support, physical vector quantities may also differ from Euclidean vectors in terms of metric. For example, an event in spacetime may be represented as a position four-vector, with coherent derived unit of meters: it includes a position Euclidean vector and a timelike component, t⋅c_{0} (involving the speed of light). In that case, the Minkowski metric is adopted instead of the Euclidean metric.

Vector quantities are a generalization of scalar quantities and can be further generalized as tensor quantities. Individual vectors may be ordered in a sequence over time (a time series), such as position vectors discretizing a trajectory. A vector may also result from the evaluation, at a particular instant, of a continuous vector-valued function (e.g., the pendulum equation). In the natural sciences, the term "vector quantity" also encompasses vector fields defined over a two- or three-dimensional region of space, such as wind velocity over Earth's surface. Pseudo vectors and bivectors are also admitted as physical vector quantities.

== See also ==
- List of vector quantities
- Vector representation
