= Concrete number =

Number associated with things being counted

A concrete number or numerus numeratus is a number associated with the things being counted, in contrast to an abstract number or numerus numerans which is a number as a single entity. For example, "five apples" and "half of a pie" are concrete numbers, while "five" and "one half" are abstract numbers. In mathematics, the term "number" is usually taken to mean an abstract number.

A denominate number is a type of concrete number with a unit of measure attached with it. For example, "5 inches" is a denominate number because it has the unit inches after it. A denominate number can correspond to the value of a physical quantity, such as length.

== History ==
Mathematicians in ancient Greece were primarily interested in abstract numbers, while writers of instructional books for practical use were not concerned with such distinctions, so the terminology distinguishing the two types of number was slow to appear. In the 16th century, textbooks began to make the distinction. This has appeared with increasing frequency until modern times.

== Denominate numbers ==
Denominate numbers are further classified as either simple, meaning a single unit is given, or compound, meaning multiple units are given. For example, 6 kg is a simple denominate number, while 324 yards 1 foot 8 inches is a compound denominate number. The process of converting a denominate number to an equivalent form that uses a different unit is called reduction. More specifically, reduction to a lower or higher unit of measurement is called reduction to lower or higher denominations. Reduction to a lower denomination is accomplished by multiplying by the number of lower units contained in each higher unit. In the case of a compound denominant number, the products are then added together. For example, 1 hour 23 minutes 20 seconds is 1 h × 3600 s/h + 23 min × 60 s/min + 20 s = 5000 seconds. Similarly, a division is used to reduce to a higher denomination, and remainders can be applied to the next highest unit to form compound denominant numbers. Addition and subtraction of compound numbers can be performed by grouping the amounts associated with each unit and performing the necessary carry and borrow operations. Multiplication and division by a pure number are again similar.

== See also ==
- Dimensional analysis
