= Base unit of measurement =

Unit of measurement adopted by convention for a base quantity

A base unit of measurement (also referred to as a base unit or fundamental unit) is a unit of measurement adopted for a base quantity. A base quantity is one of a conventionally chosen subset of physical quantities, where no quantity in the subset can be expressed in terms of the others. The SI base units, or Systéme International d'unités, consists of the metre, kilogram, second, ampere, kelvin, mole and candela.

A unit multiple (or multiple of a unit) is an integer multiple of a given unit; likewise a unit submultiple (or submultiple of a unit) is a submultiple or a unit fraction of a given unit. Unit prefixes are common base-10 or base-2 powers multiples and submultiples of units.

While a base unit is one that has been explicitly so designated, a derived unit is unit for a derived quantity, involving the combination of quantities with different units; several SI derived units are specially named. A coherent derived unit involves no conversion factors.

== Background ==
In the language of measurement, physical quantities are quantifiable aspects of the world, such as time, distance, velocity, mass, temperature, energy, and weight, and units are used to describe their magnitude or quantity. Many of these quantities are related to each other by various physical laws, and as a result the units of a quantities can be generally be expressed as a product of powers of other units; for example, momentum is mass multiplied by velocity, while velocity is distance divided by time. These relationships are discussed in dimensional analysis. Those that can be expressed in this fashion in terms of the base units are called derived units.

== International System of Units ==
In the International System of Units (SI), there are seven base units: kilogram, metre, candela, second, ampere, kelvin, and mole. Several derived units have been defined, many with special names and symbols.

In 2019 the seven SI base units were redefined in terms of seven defining constants. Therefore, the SI base units are no longer strictly necessary but were retained both for historical and practical reasons. See 2019 revision of the SI.

== Natural units ==
A set of base dimensions of quantity is a minimal set of units such that every physical quantity can be expressed in terms of this set. The traditional base dimensions are mass, length, time, charge, and temperature, but in principle, other base quantities could be used. Electric current could be used instead of charge or speed could be used instead of length. Some physicists have not recognized temperature as a base dimension since it simply expresses the energy per particle per degree of freedom which can be expressed in terms of energy (or mass, length, and time). Duff argues that only dimensionless values have physical meaning and all dimensional units are human constructs.

There are other relationships between physical quantities that can be expressed by means of fundamental constants, and to some extent it is an arbitrary decision whether to retain the fundamental constant as a quantity with dimensions or simply to define it as unity or a fixed dimensionless number, and reduce the number of explicit base quantities by one. The ontological issue is whether these fundamental constants really exist as dimensional or dimensionless quantities. This is equivalent to treating length as the same as time or understanding electric charge as a combination of quantities of mass, length, and time which may seem less natural than thinking of temperature as measuring the same material as energy (which is expressible in terms of mass, length, and time).

For instance, time and distance are related to each other by the speed of light, c, which is a fundamental constant. It is possible to use this relationship to eliminate either the base unit of time or that of distance. Similar considerations apply to the Planck constant, h, which relates energy (with dimension expressible in terms of mass, length and time) to frequency (with dimension expressible in terms of time). In theoretical physics it is customary to use such units (natural units) in which c = 1 and ħ = 1. A similar choice can be applied to the vacuum permittivity, ε_{0}.

- One could eliminate either the metre or the second by setting c to unity (or to any other fixed dimensionless number).
- One could then eliminate the kilogram by setting ħ to a dimensionless number.
- One could eliminate the ampere by setting either the vacuum permittivity ε_{0} or the elementary charge e to a dimensionless number.
- One could eliminate the mole as a base unit by setting the Avogadro constant N_{A} to 1. This is natural as it is a technical scaling constant.
- One could eliminate the kelvin as it can be argued that temperature simply expresses the energy per particle per degree of freedom, which can be expressed in terms of energy (or mass, length, and time). Another way of saying this is that the Boltzmann constant k_{B} is a technical scaling constant and could be set to a fixed dimensionless number.
- Similarly, one could eliminate the candela, as that is defined in terms of other physical quantities via a technical scaling constant, K_{cd}.
- That leaves one base dimension and an associated base unit, but there are several fundamental constants left to eliminate that too – for instance, one could use G, the gravitational constant, m_{e}, the electron rest mass, or Λ, the cosmological constant.

The preferred choices vary by the field in physics. Using natural units leaves every physical quantity expressed as a dimensionless number, which is noted by physicists disputing the existence of incompatible base quantities.

== See also ==
- Base unit of account
- Characteristic units
- Dimensional analysis
- Natural units
- One (unit)
