= Joule =

SI unit of energy

joule
- Intuitive representation of the joule as the work of a motive force

General information
- Unit system: SI
- Unit of: energy
- Symbol: J
- Named after: James Prescott Joule

Conversions
1 J in ...	... is equal to ...
- SI base units: kg⋅m^{2}⋅s^{−2}
- CGS units: 1×10^{7} erg
- watt-seconds: 1 W⋅s
- kilowatt-hours: ≈2.78×10^{−7} kW⋅h
- kilocalories (thermochemical): 2.390×10^{−4} kcal_{th}
- BTUs: 9.48×10^{−4} BTU
- electronvolts: ≈6.24×10^{18} eV

The joule (/dʒuːl/ JOOL, or /dʒaʊl/ JOWL; symbol: J) is the unit of energy in the International System of Units (SI). In terms of SI base units, one joule corresponds to one kilogram-metre squared per second squared (1 J = 1 kg⋅m^{2}⋅s^{−2}). One joule is equal to the amount of work done when a force of one newton displaces a body through a distance of one metre in the direction of that force. It is also the energy dissipated as heat when an electric current of one ampere passes through a resistance of one ohm for one second. It is named after the English physicist James Prescott Joule (1818–1889).

== Definition ==
According to the International Bureau of Weights and Measures the joule is defined as "the work done when the point of application of 1 MKS unit of force [newton] moves a distance of 1 metre in the direction of the force."

In terms of SI base units and in terms of SI derived units with special names, the joule is defined as

$$\begin{alignat}{3}
\mathrm{J} \;
&=~ \mathrm{kg{\cdot}m^2{\cdot}s^{-2}} \\[0.7ex]
&=~ \mathrm{N{\cdot}m} \\[0.7ex]
&=~ \mathrm{Pa{\cdot}m^3} \\[0.7ex]
&=~ \mathrm{W{\cdot}s} \\[0.7ex]
&=~ \mathrm{C{\cdot}V} \\[0.7ex]
\end{alignat}$$

Symbol	Name
J	joule
kg	kilogram
m	metre
s	second
N	newton
Pa	pascal
W	watt
C	coulomb
V	volt

One joule is also equivalent to any of the following:

- The work required to move an electric charge of one coulomb through an electrical potential difference of one volt, or one coulomb-volt (C⋅V). This relationship can be used to define the volt.
- The work required to produce one watt of power for one second, or one watt-second (W⋅s) (compare kilowatt-hour, which is 3.6 megajoules). This relationship can be used to define the watt.

The joule is named after James Prescott Joule. As with every SI unit named after a person, its symbol starts with an upper case letter (J), but when written in full, it follows the rules for capitalisation of a common noun; i.e., joule becomes capitalised at the beginning of a sentence and in titles but is otherwise in lower case.

== History ==
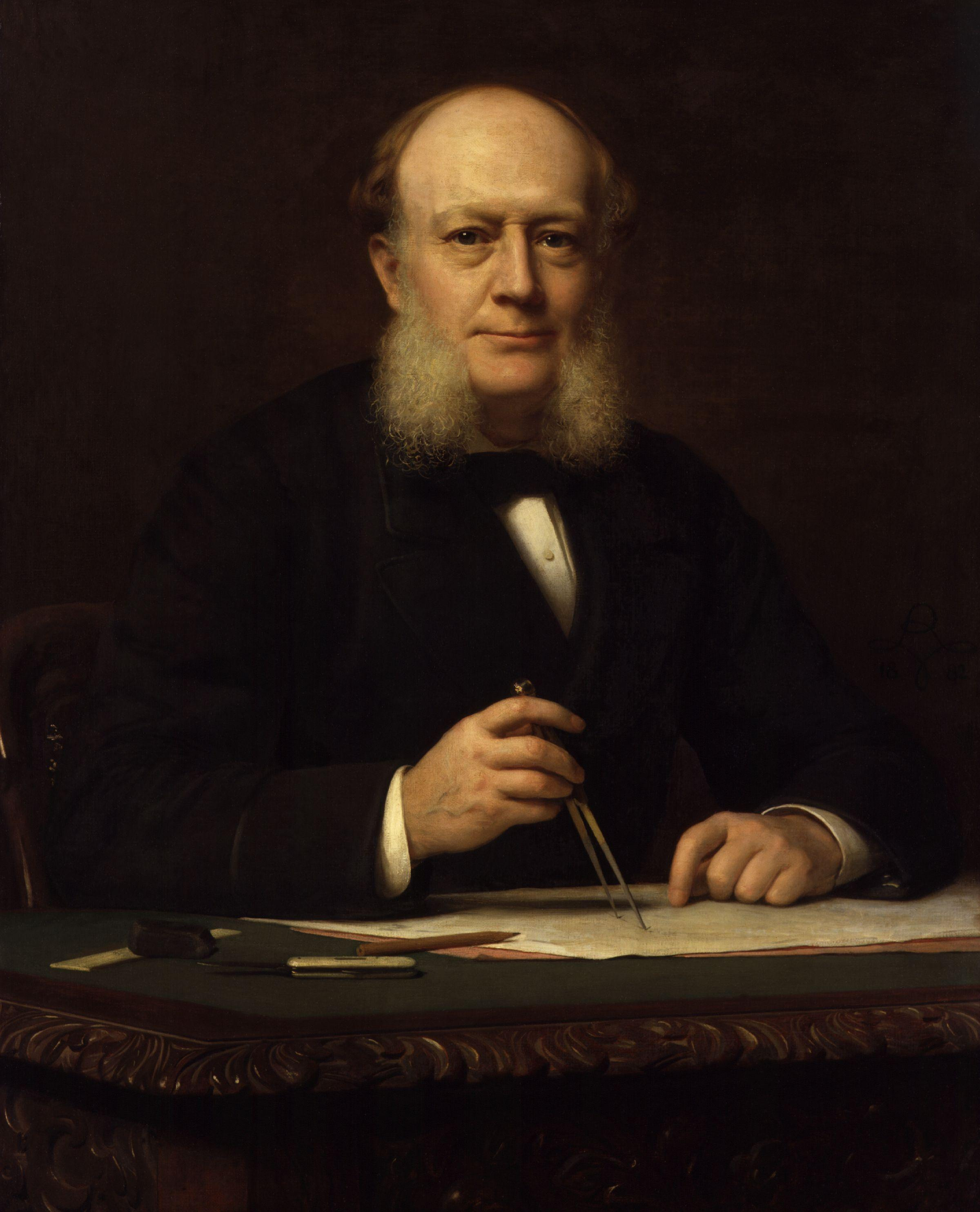
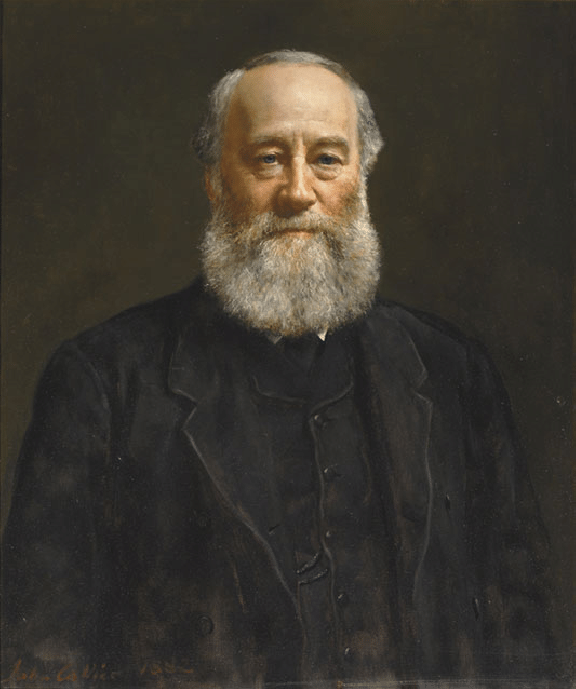
In an 1882 British Science Association meeting, Chairman Siemens (left) proposed naming the unit after James Prescott Joule (right).

The CGS system had been declared official in 1881, at the first International Electrical Congress. The erg was adopted as its unit of energy in 1882. Wilhelm Siemens, in his inauguration speech as chairman of the British Association for the Advancement of Science (23 August 1882) first proposed the joule as unit of heat, to be derived from the electromagnetic units ampere and ohm, in cgs units equivalent to 10^{7} erg. The naming of the unit in honour of James Prescott Joule (1818–1889), at the time retired and aged 63, followed the recommendation of Siemens:

Such a heat unit, if found acceptable, might with great propriety, I think, be called the Joule, after the man who has done so much to develop the dynamical theory of heat.

At the second International Electrical Congress, on 31 August 1889, the joule was officially adopted alongside the watt and the quadrant (later renamed to henry). Joule died in the same year, on 11 October 1889. At the fourth congress (1893), the "international ampere" and "international ohm" were defined, with slight changes in the specifications for their measurement, with the "international joule" being the unit derived from them.

In 1935, the International Electrotechnical Commission (successor of the International Electrical Congress) adopted the "Giorgi system", which by virtue of assuming a defined value for the magnetic constant also implied a redefinition of the joule. The Giorgi system was approved by the International Committee for Weights and Measures in 1946. The joule was no longer defined based on electromagnetic unit, but instead as the unit of work performed by one unit of force (not yet named newton) over the distance of 1 metre. The joule was explicitly intended as the unit of energy to be used in both electromagnetic and mechanical contexts. The ratification of the definition at the ninth General Conference on Weights and Measures, in 1948, added the specification that the joule was also to be preferred as the unit of heat in the context of calorimetry, thereby officially deprecating the use of the calorie. This is the definition declared in the modern International System of Units in 1960.

The definition of the joule as J = kg⋅m^{2}⋅s^{−2} has remained unchanged since 1946, but the joule as a derived unit has inherited changes in the definitions of the second (in 1960 and 1967), the metre (in 1983) and the kilogram (in 2019).

== Practical examples ==
One joule represents (approximately):

- The typical energy released as heat by a person at rest every 1/60 s (~16.6667 ms, basal metabolic rate); about 5,000 kJ (1,200 kcal) / day.
- The amount of electricity required to run a 1 W device for 1 s.
- The energy required to accelerate a 1 kg mass at 1 m/s^{2} through a distance of 1 m.
- The kinetic energy of a 2 kg mass travelling at 1 m/s, or a 1 kg mass travelling at 1.41 m/s.
- The energy required to lift an apple up 1 m, assuming the apple has a mass of 101.97 g.
- The heat required to raise the temperature of 0.239 g of water from 0 °C to 1 °C.
- The kinetic energy of a 50 kg human moving very slowly (0.2 m/s or 0.72 km/h).
- The kinetic energy of a 56 g tennis ball moving at 6 m/s (22 km/h).
- The food energy (kcal) in slightly more than half of an ordinary-sized sugar crystal (0.102 mg/crystal).

== Multiples ==
SI multiples of joule (J)
Submultiples			Multiples		
Value	SI symbol	Name	Value	SI symbol	Name
10^{−1} J	dJ	decijoule	10^{1} J	daJ	decajoule
10^{−2} J	cJ	centijoule	10^{2} J	hJ	hectojoule
10^{−3} J	**mJ**	**millijoule**	10^{3} J	**kJ**	**kilojoule**
10^{−6} J	**μJ**	**microjoule**	10^{6} J	**MJ**	**megajoule**
10^{−9} J	**nJ**	**nanojoule**	10^{9} J	**GJ**	**gigajoule**
10^{−12} J	**pJ**	**picojoule**	10^{12} J	**TJ**	**terajoule**
10^{−15} J	fJ	femtojoule	10^{15} J	PJ	petajoule
10^{−18} J	aJ	attojoule	10^{18} J	EJ	exajoule
10^{−21} J	zJ	zeptojoule	10^{21} J	ZJ	zettajoule
10^{−24} J	yJ	yoctojoule	10^{24} J	YJ	yottajoule
10^{−27} J	rJ	rontojoule	10^{27} J	RJ	ronnajoule
10^{−30} J	qJ	quectojoule	10^{30} J	QJ	quettajoule
Common multiples are in bold face

zeptojoule
160 zeptojoules is about 1 electronvolt.
The minimal energy needed to change a bit of data in computation at around room temperature – approximately 2.75 zJ – is given by the Landauer limit.
nanojoule
160 nanojoules is about the kinetic energy of a flying mosquito.
microjoule
The Large Hadron Collider (LHC) produces collisions of the microjoule order (7 TeV) per particle.
kilojoule
Nutritional food labels in most countries express energy in kilojoules (kJ).
One square metre of the Earth receives about 1.4 kilojoules of solar radiation every second in full daylight. A human in a sprint has approximately 3 kJ of kinetic energy, while a cheetah in a 122 km/h (76 mph) sprint has approximately 20 kJ. One watt-hour, of electricity or any other form of energy, is 3.6 kJ.
megajoule
The megajoule is approximately the kinetic energy of a one megagram (tonne) vehicle moving at 44.7 metres per second (161 km/h; 100 mph).
The energy required to heat 10 L of liquid water at constant pressure from 0 °C (32 °F) to 100 °C (212 °F) is approximately 4.2 MJ.
One kilowatt-hour, of electricity or any other form of energy, is 3.6 MJ.
gigajoule
6 gigajoules is about the chemical energy of combusting 1 barrel (159 L) of petroleum. 2 GJ is about the Planck energy unit. One megawatt-hour, of electricity or any other form of energy, is 3.6 GJ.
terajoule
The terajoule is about 0.278 GWh (which is often used in energy tables). About 63 TJ of energy was released by Little Boy. The International Space Station, with a mass of approximately 450 megagrams and orbital velocity of 7700 m/s, has a kinetic energy of roughly 13 TJ. In 2017, Hurricane Irma was estimated to have a peak wind energy of 112 TJ. One gigawatt-hour, of electricity or any other form of energy, is 3.6 TJ.
petajoule
210 petajoules is about 50 megatons of TNT, which is the amount of energy released by the Tsar Bomba, the largest man-made explosion ever. One terawatt-hour, of electricity or any other form of energy, is 3.6 PJ.
exajoule
The 2011 Tōhoku earthquake and tsunami in Japan had 1.41 EJ of energy according to its rating of 9.0 on the moment magnitude scale. Yearly U.S. energy consumption amounts to roughly 94 EJ, and the world final energy consumption was 439 EJ in 2021. One petawatt-hour of electricity, or any other form of energy, is 3.6 EJ.
zettajoule
The zettajoule is somewhat more than the amount of energy required to heat the Baltic Sea by 1 °C, assuming properties similar to those of pure water. Human annual world energy consumption is approximately 0.5 ZJ. The energy to raise the temperature of Earth's atmosphere 1 °C is approximately 2.2 ZJ.
yottajoule
The yottajoule is a little less than the amount of energy required to heat the Indian Ocean by 1 °C, assuming properties similar to those of pure water. The thermal output of the Sun is approximately 400 yottajoules per second (400 YW).

== Conversions ==
1 joule is equal to (approximately unless otherwise stated):

- 1.0×10^{7} erg (exactly)
- 6.24151×10^{18} eV
- 9.47817×10^{−4} BTU
- 0.737562 ft⋅lb (foot-pound)
- 23.7304 ft⋅pdl (foot-poundal)

Units with exact equivalents in joules include:

- 1 thermochemical calorie = 4.184 J
- 1 International Table calorie = 4.1868 J
- 1 W⋅h = 3,600 J; 3.6 kJ
- 1 kW⋅h = 3.6×10^{6} J; 3.6 MJ
- 1 W⋅s = 1 J
- 1 ton TNT = 4.184 GJ
- 1 foe = 10^{44} J
- 1 kilopondmetre = 9.80665 J

== Newton-metre and torque ==
In mechanics, the concept of force (in some direction) has a close analogue in the concept of torque (about some angle):

Linear	Angular
Force	Torque
Mass	Moment of inertia
Displacement	Angle

A result of this similarity is that the SI unit for torque is the newton-metre, which works out algebraically to have the same dimensions as the joule, but they are not interchangeable. The General Conference on Weights and Measures has given the unit of energy the name joule, but has not given the unit of torque any special name, hence it is simply the newton-metre (N⋅m) – a compound name derived from its constituent parts. The use of newton-metres for torque but joules for energy is helpful to avoid misunderstandings and miscommunication.

The distinction may be seen also in the fact that energy is a scalar quantity – the dot product of a force vector and a displacement vector. By contrast, torque is a vector – the cross product of a force vector and a distance vector. Torque and energy are related to one another by the equation
$$E = \tau \theta\, ,$$

where E is energy, τ is (the vector magnitude of) torque, and θ is the angle swept (in radians). Since plane angles are dimensionless, it follows that torque and energy have the same dimensions.

== Watt-second ==
A watt-second (symbol W s or W⋅s) is a derived unit of energy equivalent to the joule. The watt-second is the energy equivalent to the power of one watt sustained for one second. While the watt-second is equivalent to the joule in both units and meaning, there are some contexts in which the term "watt-second" is used instead of "joule", such as in the rating of photographic electronic flash units.
