= International System of Quantities =

System of quantities used in science and their interrelationships

Metrological dependencies between the base units of the SI

The International System of Quantities (ISQ) is a standard system of quantities used in physics and in modern science in general. It includes seven ISQ base quantities – length, mass, time, electric current, thermodynamic temperature, amount of substance, and luminous intensity – and the relationships between those quantities in derived quantities. (Note: "The system of quantities, including the relations among them the quantities used as the basis of the units of the SI, is named the International System of Quantities, denoted 'ISQ', in all languages. [...] It should be realized, however, that ISQ is simply a convenient notation to assign to the essentially infinite and continually evolving and expanding system of quantities and equations on which all of modern science and technology rests. ISQ is a shorthand notation for the 'system of quantities on which the SI is based', which was the phrase used for this system in ISO 31.") This system underlies the International System of Units (SI) (Note: "[...] the ISQ [...] is the system of quantities underlying the International System of Units, denoted 'SI', in all languages according to the SI Brochure.") but does not itself determine the units of measurement used for the quantities. The system is formally described in a multi-part standard ISO/IEC 80000, which also defines many other derived quantities used in science and technology, first completed in 2009 and subsequently revised and expanded.

== Base quantities ==
The base quantities of a given system of physical quantities form a subset in which no base quantity can be expressed in terms of the others, while every other quantity in the system can be expressed in terms of the base quantities. Within this constraint, the set of base quantities is chosen by convention.

There are seven ISQ base quantities. The symbols for them, as for other quantities, are written in italics. The conventional symbolic representation of the dimension of a base quantity is a single upper-case letter in roman (upright) sans-serif type. (Note: The sans-serif requirement is stated in BIPM JCGM 200:2012 ("The conventional symbolic representation of the dimension of a base quantity is a single upper-case letter in roman (upright) sans-serif type."), whereas ISO 80000-1:2022 is non-prescriptive ("In the ISQ, with the seven base quantities length, mass, time, electric current, thermodynamic temperature, amount of substance and luminous intensity, the dimensions of the base quantities are denoted by L, M, T, I, Θ, N and J, respectively.").) The dimension of a physical quantity does not include magnitude or units.

ISQ Base quantities
Base quantity	Symbol for dimension	Symbol for quantity (Note: The associated quantity symbol, the SI unit name and SI unit symbol are given here for reference only; they do not form part of the ISQ.)	SI base unit	SI unit symbol
length	L	l	metre	m
mass	M	m	kilogram	kg
time	T	t	second	s
electric current	I	I	ampere	A
thermodynamic temperature	Θ (Note: Greek capital theta)	T	kelvin	K
amount of substance	N	n	mole	mol
luminous intensity	J	I_{v}	candela	cd

== Derived quantities ==
A derived quantity is a quantity in a system of quantities that is defined in terms of only the base quantities of that system. There are many ISQ derived quantities and corresponding derived units.

=== Dimensional expression of derived quantities ===
The conventional symbolic representation of the dimension of a derived quantity is the product of powers of the dimensions of the base quantities according to the definition of the derived quantity. The dimension of a quantity is denoted by $\mathsf L^a \mathsf M^b \mathsf T^c \mathsf I^d \mathsf \Theta^e \mathsf N^f \mathsf J^g$, where the dimensional exponents are positive, negative, or zero. The dimension symbol may be omitted if its exponent is zero. For example, in the ISQ, the quantity dimension of velocity is denoted $\mathsf{LT}^{-1}$. The following table lists some quantities defined by the ISQ. For more, see List of physical quantities.

Derived quantity	Expression in SI base dimensions
frequency	$\mathsf T^{-1}$
force	$\mathsf{LMT}^{-2}$
pressure	$\mathsf L^{-1} \mathsf {MT}^{-2}$
velocity	$\mathsf{LT}^{-1}$
area	$\mathsf L^2$
volume	$\mathsf L^3$
acceleration	$\mathsf{LT}^{-2}$

==== Dimensionless quantities ====
A quantity of dimension one is historically known as a dimensionless quantity (a term that is still commonly used); all its dimensional exponents are zero and its dimension symbol is $1$. Such a quantity can be regarded as a derived quantity in the form of the ratio of two quantities of the same dimension. The named dimensionless units "radian" (rad) and "steradian" (sr) are acceptable for distinguishing dimensionless quantities of different kind, respectively plane angle and solid angle.

=== Logarithmic quantities ===
==== Level ====
The level of a quantity is defined as the logarithm of the ratio of the quantity with a stated reference value of that quantity. Within the ISQ it is differently defined for a root-power quantity (also known by the deprecated term field quantity) and for a power quantity. It is not defined for ratios of quantities of other kinds. Some units for levels are listed in the SI Brochure as "non-SI units". An example of level is sound pressure level, with the unit of decibel.

==== Other logarithmic quantities ====
Units of logarithmic frequency ratio include the octave, corresponding to a factor of 2 in frequency (precisely) and the decade, corresponding to a factor 10.

The ISQ recognizes another logarithmic quantity, information entropy, for which the coherent unit is the natural unit of information (symbol nat).

== Documentation ==
The system is formally described in the multi-part standard ISO/IEC 80000, first completed in 2009 but subsequently revised and expanded, which replaced standards published in 1992, ISO 31 and ISO 1000. Working jointly, International Organization for Standardization (ISO) and the International Electrotechnical Commission (IEC) have formalized parts of the ISQ by giving information and definitions concerning quantities, systems of quantities, units, quantity and unit symbols, and coherent unit systems, with particular reference to the ISQ. ISO/IEC 80000 defines physical quantities that are expressed in terms SI units and also includes many other quantities in modern science and technology. The name "International System of Quantities" is used by the General Conference on Weights and Measures (CGPM) to describe the system of quantities that underlie the International System of Units.

== See also ==
- Dimensional analysis
- List of physical quantities
- International System of Units
- SI base unit

== Notes ==
Quantity			SI unit	
Name	Symbol	Dimension symbol	Unit name	Unit symbol
time, duration	t	T	second	s
length	l, x, r, etc.	L	metre	m
mass	m	M	kilogram	kg
electric current	I , i	I	ampere	A
thermodynamic temperature	T	Θ	kelvin	K
amount of substance	n	N	mole	mol
luminous intensity	I_{v}	J	candela	cd
