= Quantities, Units and Symbols in Physical Chemistry =

Terms and symbols widely used in the field of physical chemistry

Front cover of the Green Book

Quantities, Units and Symbols in Physical Chemistry, also known as the Green Book, is a compilation of terms and symbols widely used in the field of physical chemistry. It also includes a table of physical constants, tables listing the properties of elementary particles, chemical elements, and nuclides, and information about conversion factors that are commonly used in physical chemistry. The Green Book is published by the International Union of Pure and Applied Chemistry (IUPAC) and is based on published, citeable sources. Information in the Green Book is synthesized from recommendations made by IUPAC, the International Union of Pure and Applied Physics (IUPAP) and the International Organization for Standardization (ISO), including recommendations listed in the IUPAP Red Book Symbols, Units, Nomenclature and Fundamental Constants in Physics and in the ISO 31 standards.

== History, list of editions, and translations to non-English languages ==
The third edition of the Green Book (ISBN 978-0-85404-433-7) was first published by IUPAC in 2007. A second printing of the third edition was released in 2008; this printing made several minor revisions to the 2007 text. A third printing of the third edition was released in 2011. The text of the third printing is identical to that of the second printing.

A Japanese translation of the third edition of the Green Book (ISBN 978-4-06-154359-1) was published in 2009. A French translation of the third edition of the Green Book (ISBN 978-2-8041-7207-7) was published in 2012. A Portuguese translation (Brazilian Portuguese and European Portuguese) of the third edition of the Green Book (ISBN 978-85-64099-19-7) was published in 2018, with updated values of the physical constants and atomic weights; it is referred to as the "Livro Verde".

A concise four-page summary of the most important material in the Green Book was published in the July–August 2011 issue of Chemistry International, the IUPAC news magazine.

The second edition of the Green Book (ISBN 0-632-03583-8) was first published in 1993. It was reprinted in 1995, 1996, and 1998.

The Green Book is a direct successor of the Manual of Symbols and Terminology for Physicochemical Quantities and Units, originally prepared for publication on behalf of IUPAC's Physical Chemistry Division by M. L. McGlashen in 1969. A full history of the Green Book's various editions is provided in the historical introduction to the third edition.

The second edition and the third edition (second printing) of the Green Book have both been made available online as PDF files; the PDF version of the third edition is fully searchable. The four-page concise summary is also available online as a PDF file. External Links (below).

== Handy content ==
In addition to the obvious data on quantities, units and symbols, the compilation contains some less obvious but very useful information on related topics.

=== Quantity calculus ===
Unit conversion is a notorious source of errors. Many people apply individual rules, e.g. "to obtain length in centimeters multiply the length in inches by 2.54", but combining several such conversions is laborious and prone to mistakes. A better way is to use the factor-label method, which is closely related to dimensional analysis, and quantity calculus explained in sections 1.1 and 7.1 of this compilation.

=== Scientific typography ===
Section 1.3 explains the rules for writing scientific symbols and names, for example, where to use capital letters or italics, and where their use is incorrect. The typographical rules are extensive, including even such detail as whether "20°C" or "20 °C" is the correct form.

=== Atomic units ===
Section 3.8 introduces atomic units and gives a table of atomic units of various physical quantities and the conversion factor to the SI units. Section 7.3(v) gives a concise but clear tutorial on practical use of atomic units, in particular how to understand equations "written in atomic units".
