= Quantity =

Property of magnitude or multitude

Quantity or amount is a property that includes numbers and quantifiable phenomena such as mass, time, distance, heat, angle, and information. Quantities can commonly be compared in terms of "more", "less", or "equal", or by assigning a numerical value multiple of a unit of measurement. Quantity is among the basic classes of things along with quality, substance, change, and relation. Some quantities are such by their inner nature (as number), while others function as states (properties, dimensions, attributes) of things such as heavy and light, long and short, broad and narrow, small and great, or much and little.

Under the name of multitude comes what is discontinuous and discrete and divisible ultimately into indivisibles, such as: army, fleet, flock, government, company, party, people, mess (military), chorus, crowd, and number; all which are cases of collective nouns. Under the name of magnitude comes what is continuous and unified and divisible only into smaller divisibles, such as: matter, mass, energy, liquid, material—all cases of non-collective nouns.

Along with analyzing its nature and classification, the issues of quantity involve such closely related topics as dimensionality, equality, proportion, the measurements of quantities, the units of measurements, number and numbering systems, the types of numbers and their relations to each other as numerical ratios.

== Background ==
In mathematics, the concept of quantity is an ancient one extending back to the time of Aristotle and earlier. Aristotle regarded quantity as a fundamental ontological and scientific category. In Aristotle's ontology, quantity or quantum was classified into two different types, which he characterized as follows:

Quantum means that which is divisible into two or more constituent parts, of which each is by nature a one and a this. A quantum is a plurality if it is numerable, a magnitude if it is measurable. Plurality means that which is divisible potentially into non-continuous parts, magnitude that which is divisible into continuous parts; of magnitude, that which is continuous in one dimension is length; in two breadth, in three depth. Of these, limited plurality is number, limited length is a line, breadth a surface, depth a solid.

— Aristotle, Metaphysics, Book V, Ch. 11-14

In his Elements, Euclid developed the theory of ratios of magnitudes without studying the nature of magnitudes, as Archimedes, but giving the following significant definitions:

A magnitude is a part of a magnitude, the less of the greater, when it measures the greater; A ratio is a sort of relation in respect of size between two magnitudes of the same kind.

— Euclid, Elements

For Aristotle and Euclid, relations were conceived as whole numbers (Michell, 1993). John Wallis later conceived of ratios of magnitudes as real numbers:

When a comparison in terms of ratio is made, the resultant ratio often [namely with the exception of the 'numerical genus' itself] leaves the genus of quantities compared, and passes into the numerical genus, whatever the genus of quantities compared may have been.

— John Wallis, Mathesis Universalis

That is, the ratio of magnitudes of any quantity, whether volume, mass, heat and so on, is a number. Following this, Newton then defined number, and the relationship between quantity and number, in the following terms:

By number we understand not so much a multitude of unities, as the abstracted ratio of any quantity to another quantity of the same kind, which we take for unity.

— Newton, 1728

== Structure ==
Continuous quantities possess a particular structure that was first explicitly characterized by Hölder (1901) as a set of axioms that define such features as identities and relations between magnitudes. In science, quantitative structure is the subject of empirical investigation and cannot be assumed to exist a priori for any given property. The linear continuum represents the prototype of continuous quantitative structure as characterized by Hölder (1901) (translated in Michell & Ernst, 1996). A fundamental feature of any type of quantity is that the relationships of equality or inequality can in principle be stated in comparisons between particular magnitudes, unlike quality, which is marked by likeness, similarity and difference, diversity. Another fundamental feature is additivity. Additivity may involve concatenation, such as adding two lengths A and B to obtain a third A + B. Additivity is not, however, restricted to extensive quantities but may also entail relations between magnitudes that can be established through experiments that permit tests of hypothesized observable manifestations of the additive relations of magnitudes. Another feature is continuity, on which Michell (1999, p. 51) says of length, as a type of quantitative attribute, "what continuity means is that if any arbitrary length, a, is selected as a unit, then for every positive real number, r, there is a length b such that b = ra". A further generalization is given by the theory of conjoint measurement, independently developed by French economist Gérard Debreu (1960) and by the American mathematical psychologist R. Duncan Luce and statistician John Tukey (1964).

== In mathematics ==
Magnitude (how much) and multitude (how many), the two principal types of quantities, are further divided as mathematical and physical. In formal terms, quantities—their ratios, proportions, order and formal relationships of equality and inequality—are studied by mathematics. The essential part of mathematical quantities consists of having a collection of variables, each assuming a set of values. These can be a set of a single quantity, referred to as a scalar when represented by real numbers, or have multiple quantities as do vectors and tensors, two kinds of geometric objects.

The mathematical usage of a quantity can then be varied and so is situationally dependent. Quantities can be used as being infinitesimal, arguments of a function, variables in an expression (independent or dependent), or probabilistic as in random and stochastic quantities. In mathematics, magnitudes and multitudes are also not only two distinct kinds of quantity but furthermore relatable to each other.

Number theory covers the topics of the discrete quantities as numbers: number systems with their kinds and relations. Geometry studies the issues of spatial magnitudes: straight lines, curved lines, surfaces and solids, all with their respective measurements and relationships.

A traditional Aristotelian realist philosophy of mathematics, stemming from Aristotle and remaining popular until the eighteenth century, held that mathematics is the "science of quantity". Quantity was considered to be divided into the discrete (studied by arithmetic) and the continuous (studied by geometry and later calculus). The theory fits reasonably well elementary or school mathematics but less well the abstract topological and algebraic structures of modern mathematics.

== In science ==
Establishing quantitative structure and relationships between different quantities is the cornerstone of modern science, especially but not restricted to physical sciences. Physics is fundamentally a quantitative science; chemistry, biology and others are increasingly so. Their progress is chiefly achieved due to rendering the abstract qualities of material entities into physical quantities, by postulating that all material bodies marked by quantitative properties or physical dimensions are subject to some measurements and observations. Setting the units of measurement, physics covers such fundamental quantities as space (length, breadth, and depth) and time, mass and force, temperature, energy, and quanta.

A distinction has also been made between intensive quantity and extensive quantity as two types of quantitative property, state or relation. The magnitude of an intensive quantity does not depend on the size, or extent, of the object or system of which the quantity is a property, whereas magnitudes of an extensive quantity are additive for parts of an entity or subsystems. Thus, magnitude does depend on the extent of the entity or system in the case of extensive quantity. Examples of intensive quantities are density and pressure, while examples of extensive quantities are energy, volume, and mass.

== In natural language ==
In human languages, including English, number is a syntactic category, along with person and gender. The quantity is expressed by identifiers, definite and indefinite, and quantifiers, definite and indefinite, as well as by three types of nouns: 1. count unit nouns or countables; 2. mass nouns, uncountables, referring to the indefinite, unidentified amounts; 3. nouns of multitude (collective nouns). The word ‘number’ belongs to a noun of multitude standing either for a single entity or for the individuals making the whole. An amount in general is expressed by a special class of words called identifiers, indefinite and definite and quantifiers, definite and indefinite. The amount may be expressed by: singular form and plural from, ordinal numbers before a count noun singular (first, second, third...), the demonstratives; definite and indefinite numbers and measurements (hundred/hundreds, million/millions), or cardinal numbers before count nouns. The set of language quantifiers covers "a few, a great number, many, several (for count names); a bit of, a little, less, a great deal (amount) of, much (for mass names); all, plenty of, a lot of, enough, more, most, some, any, both, each, either, neither, every, no". For the complex case of unidentified amounts, the parts and examples of a mass are indicated with respect to the following: a measure of a mass (two kilos of rice and twenty bottles of milk or ten pieces of paper); a piece or part of a mass (part, element, atom, item, article, drop); or a shape of a container (a basket, box, case, cup, bottle, vessel, jar).

== Further examples ==
Some further examples of quantities are:

- 1.76 litres (liters) of milk, a continuous quantity
- 2πr metres, where r is the length of a radius of a circle expressed in metres (or meters), also a continuous quantity
- one apple, two apples, three apples, where the number is an integer representing the count of a denumerable collection of objects (apples)
- 500 people (also a type of count data)
- a couple conventionally refers to two objects.
- a few usually refers to an indefinite, but usually small number, greater than one.
- quite a few also refers to an indefinite, but surprisingly (in relation to the context) large number.
- several refers to an indefinite, but usually small, number – usually indefinitely greater than "a few".

== Dimensionless quantity ==
Dimensionless quantities, or quantities of dimension one, are quantities with no associated units of measurement. These may be ratios of quantities with the same physical units or ratios of dimensionally equal products with identical units. For instance, alcohol by volume (ABV) represents a volumetric ratio; its value remains independent of the specific units of volume used, such as in milliliters per milliliter (mL/mL).

The number one has been suggested as a dimensionless base quantity. Radians serve as dimensionless units for angular measurements, derived from the universal ratio of 2π times the radius of a circle being equal to its circumference.

In the International System of Quantities, certain well established dimensionless quantities are called characteristic numbers, resulting from the combination of characteristic quantities, such as characteristic length, characteristic time, etc.

Physics relies on dimensionless numbers like the Reynolds number in fluid dynamics, the fine-structure constant in quantum mechanics, and the Lorentz factor in relativity. In chemistry, state properties and ratios such as mole fractions (as concentration ratios) are dimensionless. Mathematics texts commonly omit units, making quantities like area and length appear to be dimensionless.

== See also ==
- Physical quantity
- Quantification (science)
- Observable quantity
- Numerical value equation

== Sources ==
- Aristotle, Logic (Organon): Categories, in Great Books of the Western World, V.1. ed. by Adler, M.J., Encyclopædia Britannica, Inc., Chicago (1990)
- Aristotle, Physical Treatises: Physics, in Great Books of the Western World, V.1, ed. by Adler, M.J., Encyclopædia Britannica, Inc., Chicago (1990)
- Aristotle, Metaphysics, in Great Books of the Western World, V.1, ed. by Adler, M.J., Encyclopædia Britannica, Inc., Chicago (1990)
- Franklin, J. (2014). Quantity and number, in Neo-Aristotelian Perspectives in Metaphysics, ed. D.D. Novotny and L. Novak, New York: Routledge, 221–44.
- Hölder, O. (1901). Die Axiome der Quantität und die Lehre vom Mass. Berichte über die Verhandlungen der Königlich Sachsischen Gesellschaft der Wissenschaften zu Leipzig, Mathematische-Physicke Klasse, 53, 1–64.
- Klein, J. (1968). Greek Mathematical Thought and the Origin of Algebra. Cambridge. Mass: MIT Press.
- Laycock, H. (2006). Words without Objects: Oxford, Clarendon Press. Oxfordscholarship.com Archived 2007-09-27 at the Wayback Machine
- Michell, J. (1993). The origins of the representational theory of measurement: Helmholtz, Hölder, and Russell. Studies in History and Philosophy of Science, 24, 185–206.
- Michell, J. (1999). Measurement in Psychology. Cambridge: Cambridge University Press.
- Michell, J. & Ernst, C. (1996). The axioms of quantity and the theory of measurement: translated from Part I of Otto Hölder's German text "Die Axiome der Quantität und die Lehre vom Mass". Journal of Mathematical Psychology, 40, 235–252.
- Newton, I. (1728/1967). Universal Arithmetic: Or, a Treatise of Arithmetical Composition and Resolution. In D.T. Whiteside (Ed.), The mathematical Works of Isaac Newton, Vol. 2 (pp. 3–134). New York: Johnson Reprint Corp.
- Wallis, J. Mathesis universalis (as quoted in Klein, 1968).
