= Direction (geometry) =

Property shared by codirectional lines

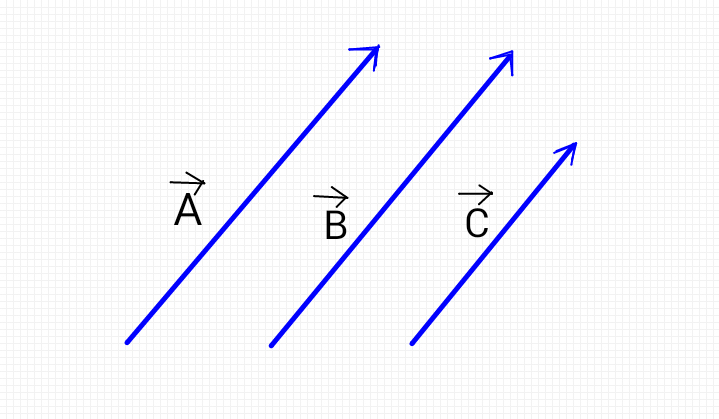
Three line segments with the same direction

Examples of two 2D direction vectors

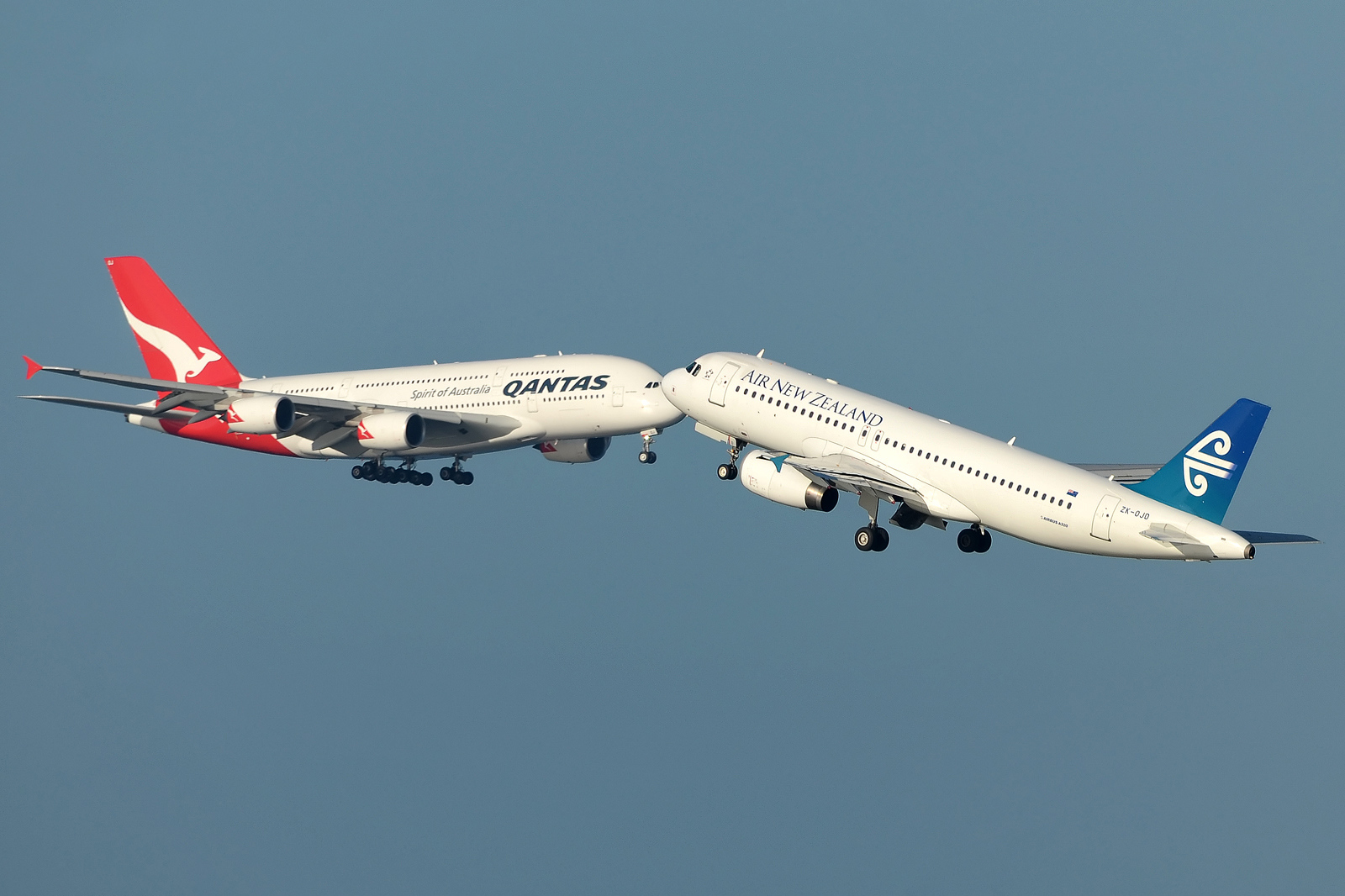
Two airplanes in nearly parallel (and opposite) directions

In geometry, direction, also known as spatial direction, vector direction or relative direction, is the common characteristic of all rays which coincide when translated to share a common endpoint; equivalently, it is the common characteristic of vectors (such as the relative position between a pair of points) which can be made equal by scaling (by some positive scalar multiplier).

Two vectors sharing the same direction are said to be codirectional or equidirectional. All codirectional line segments sharing the same size (length) are said to be equipollent. Two equipollent segments are not necessarily coincident; for example, a given direction can be evaluated at different starting positions, defining different unit directed line segments (as a bound vector instead of a free vector). Two colinear rays or oriented line segments (sharing the same supporting line) are not necessarily codirectional and vice versa.

A direction is often represented as a unit vector, the result of dividing a vector by its length. A direction can alternately be represented by a point on a circle or sphere, the intersection between the sphere and a ray in that direction emanating from the sphere's center; the tips of unit vectors emanating from a common origin point lie on the unit sphere.

A two-dimensional direction (2D direction), in 2D space, can be represented by its angle, measured from some reference direction, the angular component of polar coordinates (ignoring or normalizing the polar radius). A three-dimensional direction (3D direction), in 3D space, can be represented using two angles, the angular components of spherical coordinates: a polar angle relative to a fixed polar axis and an azimuthal angle about the polar axis.

An arbitrary direction can also be specified in a Cartesian coordinate system, defined in terms of mutually orthogonal coordinate axes. Any arbitrary direction can be represented numerically by finding the direction cosines (a list of cosines of the angles), which are equivalent to the Cartesian coordinates of the associated unit vector.

A direction is used to represent linear objects such as axes of rotation and normal vectors. A direction may be used as part of the representation of a more complicated object's attitude or orientation in physical space, which may be specified by means of three angles – two angles for specifying the 3D direction and a third one for a possible axial rotation – or other equivalent set of three parameters (see Rotation formulations in three dimensions).

Two directions are said to be opposite if the unit vectors representing them are additive inverses, or if the points on a sphere representing them are antipodal, at the two opposite ends of a common diameter. The combination of a given direction and its corresponding opposite direction forms an undirected "line", sometimes called the direction line or an orientation, (Note: Not strictly a line, as the direction "line" or "orientation" (not to be confused with an attitude) is a free vector.) e.g., the east-west orientation supporting both east direction and west direction.

Two directions are parallel (as in parallel lines) if they can be brought to lie on the same straight line without rotations; parallel directions are either codirectional or opposite. (Note: Sometimes, parallel and antiparallel are used as synonyms of codirectional and opposite, respectively.) Two directions are obtuse or acute if they form, respectively, an obtuse angle (greater than a right angle) or acute angle (smaller than a right angle); equivalently, obtuse directions and acute directions have, respectively, negative and positive scalar product (or scalar projection).

Non-oriented straight lines or line segments can also be considered to have a "direction", the common characteristic of all parallel lines, which can be made to coincide by translation to pass through a common point. The direction of a non-oriented line in a two-dimensional plane can be represented numerically by its slope with respect to a reference axis. However, the "direction" of a non-oriented line corresponds to two opposite directions of coincident oriented lines.

A directional extent (sometimes called an angular extent) is a set of contiguous geometric directions sharing a common point. It spans a bundle of lines and subtends a solid angle (in steradians) in space. It is delimited by a generalized cone, which also defines a spherical polygon centered at the common point. In optics, it is used to model fields of view, cones of rays, viewing cones, etc. On the plane, it corresponds to an angular interval.

== See also ==
- Body-relative direction
- Euclidean vector
- Directional statistics
- Tangent direction
