= Unit of measurement =

Quantity standard

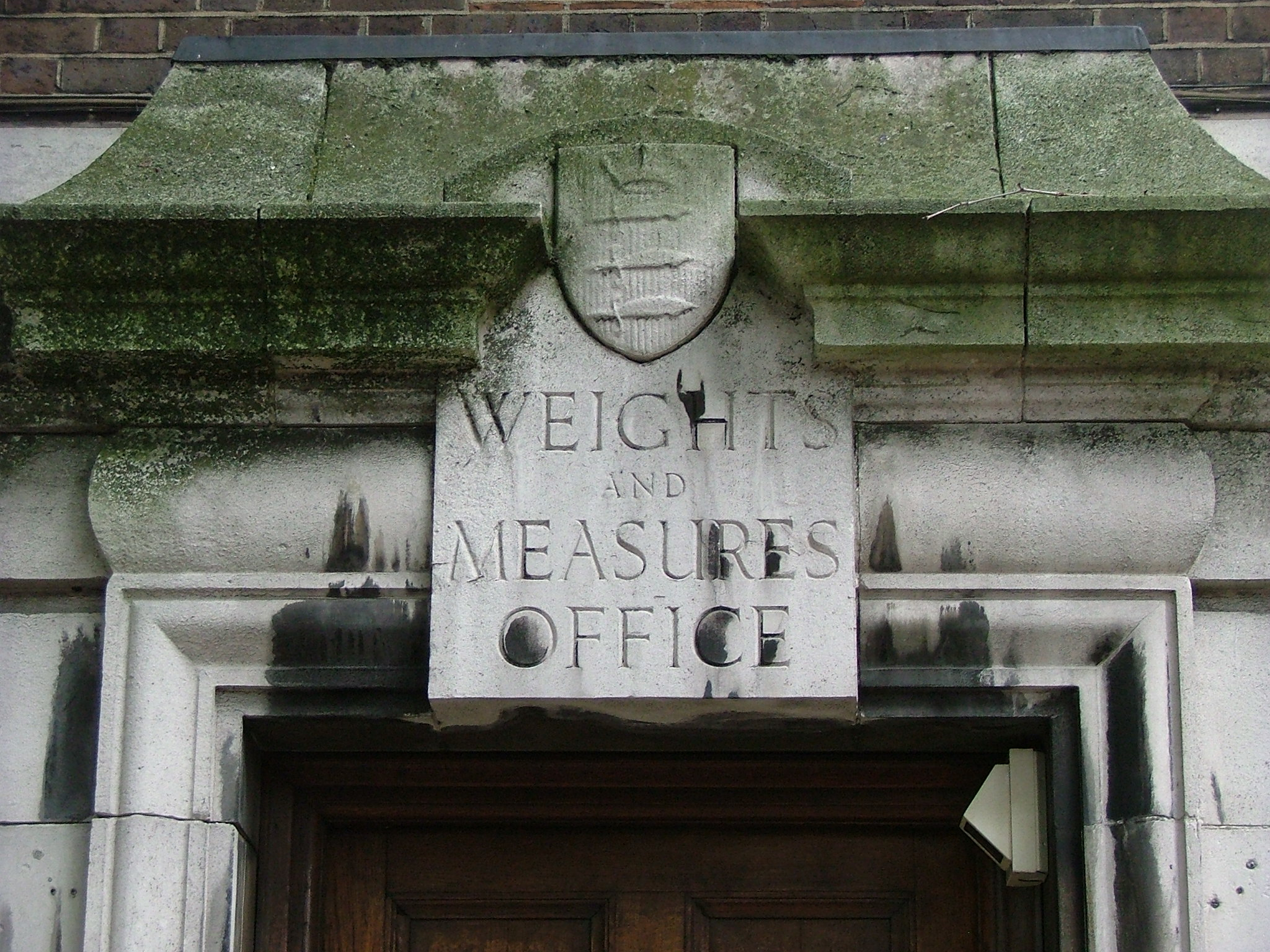
The former Weights and Measures office in Seven Sisters, London

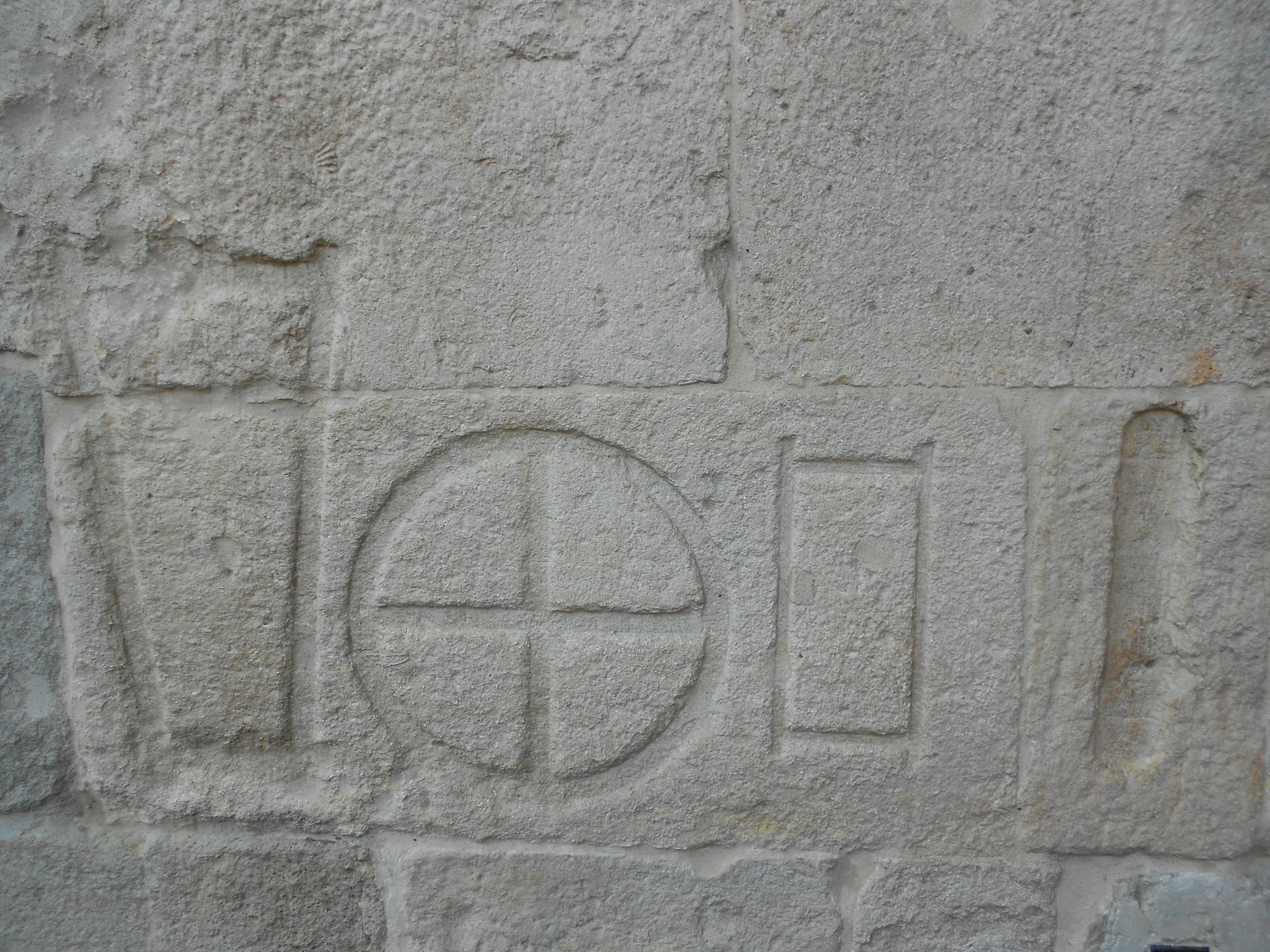
Units of measurement, Palazzo della Ragione, Padua

A unit of measurement, or unit of measure, is a definite magnitude of a quantity, defined and adopted by convention or by law, that is used as a standard for measurement of the same kind of quantity. Any other quantity of that kind can be expressed as a multiple of the unit of measurement, For example, a length is a physical quantity. The metre (symbol: m) is a unit of length that represents a definite predetermined length. For instance, when referencing "10 metres" (or 10 m), what is meant is 10 times the definite predetermined length called "metre".

The definition, agreement, and practical use of units of measurement have played a crucial role in human endeavour from early ages up to the present. A multitude of systems of units used to be very common. Now there is a global standard, the International System of Units (SI), which is the modern form of the metric system, replacing the cgs system.

In trade, weights and measures are often a subject of governmental regulation, to ensure fairness and transparency. The International Bureau of Weights and Measures (BIPM) is tasked with ensuring worldwide uniformity of measurements and their traceability to the International System of Units (SI).

Metrology is the science of developing nationally and internationally accepted units of measurement. In physics and metrology, units are standards for measurement of physical quantities that need clear definitions to be useful. Reproducibility of experimental results is central to the scientific method. A standard system of units facilitates this. Scientific systems of units are a refinement of the concept of weights and measures historically developed for commercial purposes.

Science, medicine, and engineering often use larger and smaller units of measurement than those used in everyday life. The judicious selection of the units of measurement can aid researchers in problem solving (see, for example, dimensional analysis).

== History ==
A unit of measurement is a standardized quantity of a physical property, used as a factor to express occurring quantities of that property. Units of measurement were among the earliest tools invented by humans. Primitive societies needed rudimentary measures for many tasks, some of those tasks are: constructing dwellings of an appropriate size and shape, fashioning clothing, or bartering food or raw materials. Before the establishment of the decimal metric system in France during the French Revolution in the late 18th century, many units of length were determined by the size of parts of the human body.

The earliest known uniform systems of measurement seem to have all been created sometime in the 4th and 3rd millennia BC among the ancient peoples of Mesopotamia, Egypt and the Indus Valley, and perhaps also Elam in Persia as well.

Weights and measures are mentioned in the Bible (Leviticus 19:35–36). It is a commandment to be honest and have fair measures.

In the Magna Carta of 1215 (The Great Charter) with the seal of King John, put before him by the Barons of England, King John agreed in Clause 35 "There shall be one measure of wine throughout our whole realm, and one measure of ale and one measure of corn—namely, the London quart;—and one width of dyed and russet and hauberk cloths—namely, two ells below the selvage..."

As of the 21st century, the International System is predominantly used in the world. There exist other unit systems such as the United States Customary System and the Imperial System. The United States is the only industrialized country that has not yet at least mostly converted to the metric system. The systematic effort to develop a universally acceptable system of units dates back to 1790 when the French National Assembly charged the French Academy of Sciences to come up such a unit system. This system was the precursor to the metric system which was quickly developed in France but did not take on universal acceptance until 1875 when The Metric Convention Treaty was signed by 17 nations. After this treaty was signed, a General Conference of Weights and Measures (CGPM) was established. The CGPM produced the current SI, which was adopted in 1954 at the 10th Conference of Weights and Measures. Currently, the United States is a dual-system society which uses both the SI and the US Customary system.

== Definition ==
The formal definition of unit of measurement (or measurement unit) is

real scalar quantity, defined and adopted by convention, with which any other quantity of the same kind can be compared to express the ratio of the two quantities as a number

Numerous physical quantity examples, such as length, time, or mass, appear in the List of physical quantities which also serves as a list of units of measurement.

== Systems of units ==
The use of a single unit of measurement for some quantity has obvious drawbacks. For example, it is impractical to use the same unit for the distance between two cities and the length of a needle. Thus, historically they would develop independently. One way to make large numbers or small fractions easier to read, is to use unit prefixes.

At some point in time though, the need to relate the two units might arise, and consequently the need to choose one unit as defining the other or vice versa. For example, an inch could be defined in terms of a barleycorn. A system of measurement is a collection of units of measurement and rules relating them to each other.

As science progressed, a need arose to relate the measurement systems of different quantities, like length and weight and volume. The effort of attempting to relate different traditional systems between each other exposed many inconsistencies, and brought about the development of new units and systems.

Systems of units vary from country to country. Some of the different systems include the centimetre–gram–second, foot–pound–second, metre–kilogram–second systems, and the International System of Units, SI. Among the different systems of units used in the world, the most widely used and internationally accepted one is SI. The base SI units are the second, metre, kilogram, ampere, kelvin, mole and candela; all other SI units are derived from these base units.

Systems of measurement in modern use include the metric system, the imperial system, and United States customary units.

=== Traditional systems ===
Historically many of the systems of measurement which had been in use were to some extent based on the dimensions of the human body. Such units, which may be called anthropic units, include the cubit, based on the length of the forearm; the pace, based on the length of a stride; and the foot and hand. As a result, units of measure could vary not only from location to location but from person to person. Units not based on the human body could be based on agriculture, as is the case with the furlong, acre and carucate, each based on the amount of land able to be worked by a team of oxen.

=== Metric systems ===
Metric systems of units have evolved since the adoption of the original metric system in France in 1791. The current international standard metric system is the International System of Units (abbreviated to SI). An important feature of modern systems is standardization. Each unit has a universally recognized size.

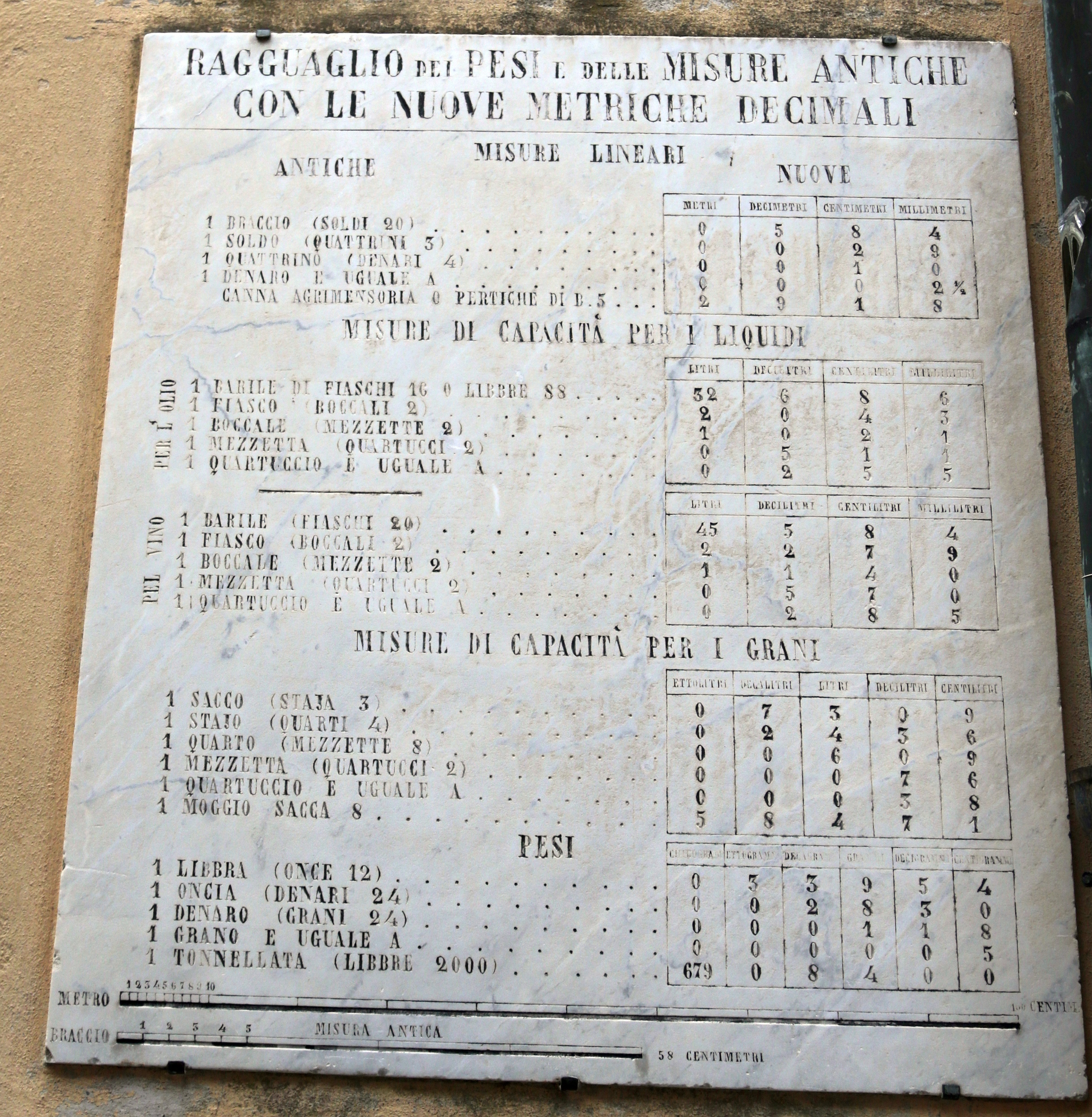
An example of metrication in 1860 when Tuscany became part of modern Italy (ex. one "libbra" = 339.54 grams)

Both the imperial units and US customary units derive from earlier English units. Imperial units were mostly used in the British Commonwealth and the former British Empire. US customary units are still the main system of measurement used in the United States outside of science, medicine, many sectors of industry, and some of government and military, and despite Congress having legally authorised metric measure on 28 July 1866. Some steps towards US metrication have been made, particularly the redefinition of basic US and imperial units to derive exactly from SI units. Since the international yard and pound agreement of 1959 the US and imperial inch is now defined as exactly 0.0254 m, and the US and imperial avoirdupois pound is now defined as exactly 0.45359237 kg.

=== Natural systems ===
While the above systems of units are based on arbitrary unit values, formalised as standards, natural units in physics are based on physical principle or are selected to make physical equations easier to work with. For example, atomic units (au) were designed to simplify the wave equation in atomic physics.

Some unusual and non-standard units may be encountered in sciences. These may include the solar mass (2×10^{30} kg), the megaton (the energy released by detonating one million tons of trinitrotoluene, TNT) and the electronvolt.

=== Legal control of weights and measures ===
To reduce the incidence of retail fraud, many national statutes have standard definitions of weights and measures that may be used (hence "statute measure"), and these are verified by legal officers.

=== Informal comparison to familiar concepts ===
In informal settings, a quantity may be described as multiples of that of a familiar entity, which can be easier to contextualize than a value in a formal unit system. For instance, a publication may describe an area in a foreign country as a number of multiples of the area of a region local to the readership. The propensity for certain concepts to be used frequently can give rise to loosely defined "systems" of units.

== Base and derived units ==
For most quantities, a unit is necessary to communicate values of that physical quantity. For example, it is necessary to use some form of unit to convey to someone a particular length, because a length can be described only in relation to an understood defined quantity, such as another length that is known to both people.

Not all quantities require a dedicated unit. Using physical laws, units of quantities can be expressed in terms of a combination of unit for other quantities. This allows a small set of units to be used to define all others. These units are taken as the base units and the other units are derived units. Thus, base units are the units of the quantities that are independent of other quantities. In the SI, these are the units of length, mass, time, electric current, temperature, luminous intensity and amount of substance. Derived units are the units of the quantities that are derived from the base quantities and some of the derived units are the units of speed, work, acceleration, energy, pressure, etc.

Different systems of units are based on different choices of a set of related units including fundamental and derived units.

== Physical quantity components ==
Following ISO 80000-1, any value of a physical quantity Z is expressed as the product of a numerical value {Z} (a pure number) and a unit [Z]:

$$Z = \{Z\} \times [Z]$$

The value is sometimes called denominate number or magnitude (although "magnitude" typically refers to the absolute value or vector norm). For example, let $Z$ be "2 metres"; then, $\{Z\} = 2$ is the numerical value and $[Z] = \mathrm{metre}$ is the unit. Conversely, the numerical value expressed in an arbitrary unit can be obtained as:

$$\{Z\} = Z / [Z]$$

The multiplication sign is usually left out, just as it is left out between variables in the scientific notation of formulas. The convention used to express quantities is referred to as quantity calculus. In formulas, the unit [Z] can be treated as if it were a specific magnitude of a kind of physical dimension: see Dimensional analysis for more on this treatment.

== Dimensional homogeneity ==
Units can only be added or subtracted if they are the same type; however units can always be multiplied or divided, as George Gamow used to explain. Let $Z$ be "2 metres" and $W$ "3 seconds", then
$$2\,\mathrm{metres} \times 3\,\mathrm{seconds} = \{Z\}\{W\} \times [Z][W] = 6 \, \mathrm{metres} \times \mathrm{seconds}$$.

There are certain rules that apply to units:

- Only like terms may be added. When a unit is divided by itself, the division yields a unitless one. When two different units are multiplied or divided, the result is a new unit, referred to by the combination of the units. For instance, in SI, the unit of speed is metre per second (m/s). See dimensional analysis. A unit can be multiplied by itself, creating a unit with an exponent (e.g. m^{2}/s^{2}). Put simply, units obey the laws of indices. (See Exponentiation.)
- Some units have special names, however these should be treated like their equivalents. For example, one newton (N) is equivalent to 1 kg⋅m/s^{2}. Thus a quantity may have several unit designations, for example: the unit for surface tension can be referred to as either N/m (newton per metre) or kg/s^{2} (kilogram per second squared).

== Converting units of measurement ==
Conversion of units is the conversion of the unit of measurement in which a quantity is expressed, typically through a multiplicative conversion factor that changes the unit without changing the quantity. This is also often loosely taken to include replacement of a quantity with a corresponding quantity that describes the same physical property.

Unit conversion is often easier within a metric system such as the SI than in others, due to the system's coherence and its metric prefixes that act as power-of-10 multipliers.

== In software development ==
Software developers in a wide variety of fields including scientific, healthcare and financial applications have sought to adopt approaches that reduce bugs and mistakes involving units of measurement. In object-oriented programming, this is often achieved using the Quantity pattern to pair together the value and the unit. (In financial applications, it is common to represent monetary values by storing them with the currency—this is often known as the 'Money pattern'.) The programming language F# has syntactic support for representing units of measure, converting between them, and checking their type safety at compile-time.

== Real-world implications ==
One example of the importance of agreed units is the failure of the NASA Mars Climate Orbiter, which was accidentally destroyed on a mission to Mars in September 1999 (instead of entering orbit) due to miscommunications about the value of forces: different computer programs used different units of measurement (newton versus pound force). Considerable amounts of effort, time, and money were wasted.

On 15 April 1999, Korean Air cargo flight 6316 from Shanghai to Seoul was lost due to the crew confusing tower instructions (in metres) and altimeter readings (in feet). Three crew and five people on the ground were killed. Thirty-seven were injured.

In 1983, a Boeing 767 (which thanks to its pilot's gliding skills landed safely and became known as the Gimli Glider) ran out of fuel in mid-flight because of two mistakes in figuring the fuel supply of Air Canada's first aircraft to use metric measurements. This accident was the result of both confusion due to the simultaneous use of metric and Imperial measures and confusion of mass and volume measures.

When planning his journey across the Atlantic Ocean in the 1480s, Columbus mistakenly assumed that the mile referred to in the Arabic estimate of 56 2/3 miles for the size of a degree was the same as the much shorter Italian mile of 1,480 metres. His estimate for the size of the degree and for the circumference of the Earth was therefore about 25% too small.

== See also ==
- Dimensional metrology
- Forensic metrology
- Smart Metrology
- Time metrology
- Quantum metrology
- GNU Units
- List of humorous units of measurement
- List of obsolete units of measurement
- List of unusual units of measurement
- Measure word
- List of metric units
- Numerical-value equation
- Scottish units
- Seconds pendulum
- Space (punctuation)#Unit symbols and numbers
- System of measurement
- Unified Code for Units of Measure
- United States customary units
- Unit of account
- Units of information
