= Vector notation =

Use of coordinates for representing vectors

Vector notation

Vector arrow
Pointing from A to B

Vector components
Describing an arrow vector v by its coordinates x and y yields an isomorphism of vector spaces.

Scalar product
Two equal-length sequences of coordinate vectors and returns a single number

Vector product
The cross-product in respect to a right-handed coordinate system

In mathematics and physics, vector notation is a commonly used notation for representing vectors, which may be Euclidean vectors, or more generally, members of a vector space.

For denoting a vector, the common typographic convention is lower case, upright boldface type, as in v. The International Organization for Standardization (ISO) recommends either bold italic serif, as in v, or non-bold italic serif accented by a right arrow, as in $\vec{v}$. In advanced mathematics, vectors are often represented in a simple italic type, like any variable.

Vector representations include Cartesian, polar, cylindrical, and spherical coordinates.

== History ==
In 1835 Giusto Bellavitis introduced the idea of equipollent directed line segments $AB \bumpeq CD$ which resulted in the concept of a vector as an equivalence class of such segments.

The term vector was coined by W. R. Hamilton around 1843, as he revealed quaternions, a system which uses vectors and scalars to span a four-dimensional space. For a quaternion q = a + bi + cj + dk, Hamilton used two projections: S q = a, for the scalar part of q, and V q = bi + cj + dk, the vector part. Using the modern terms cross product (×) and dot product (.), the quaternion product of two vectors p and q can be written pq = –p.q + p×q. In 1878, W. K. Clifford severed the two products to make the quaternion operation useful for students in his textbook Elements of Dynamic. Lecturing at Yale University, Josiah Willard Gibbs supplied notation for the scalar product and vector products, which was introduced in Vector Analysis.

In 1891, Oliver Heaviside argued for Clarendon to distinguish vectors from scalars. He criticized the use of Greek letters by Tait and Gothic letters by Maxwell.

In 1912, J.B. Shaw contributed his "Comparative Notation for Vector Expressions" to the Bulletin of the Quaternion Association. Subsequently, Alexander Macfarlane described 15 criteria for clear expression with vectors in the same publication.

Vector ideas were advanced by Hermann Grassmann in 1841, and again in 1862 in the German language. But German mathematicians were not taken with quaternions as much as were English-speaking mathematicians. When Felix Klein was organizing the German mathematical encyclopedia, he assigned Arnold Sommerfeld to standardize vector notation. In 1950, when Academic Press published G. Kuerti’s translation of the second edition of volume 2 of Lectures on Theoretical Physics by Sommerfeld, vector notation was the subject of a footnote: "In the original German text, vectors and their components are printed in the same Gothic types. The more usual way of making a typographical distinction between the two has been adopted for this translation."

Felix Klein commented on differences in notation of vectors and their operations in 1925 through a Mr. Seyfarth who prepared a supplement to Elementary Mathematics from an Advanced Standpoint — Geometry after "repeated conferences" with him.

The terms line-segment, plane-segment, plane magnitude, inner and outer product come from Grassmann, while the words scalar, vector, scalar product, and vector product came from Hamilton. The disciples of Grassmann, in other ways so orthodox, replaced in part the appropriate expressions of the master by others. The existing terminologies were merged or modified, and the symbols which indicate the separate operations have been used with the greatest arbitrariness. On these accounts even for the expert, a great lack of clearness has crept into this field, which is mathematically so simple.

Efforts to unify the various notational terms through committees of the International Congress of Mathematicians were described as follows:

The Committee which was set up in Rome for the unification of vector notation did not have the slightest success, as was to have been expected. At the following Congress in Cambridge (1912), they had to explain that they had not finished their task, and to request that their time be extended to the meeting of the next Congress, which was to have taken place in Stockholm in 1916, but which was omitted because of the war. The committee on units and symbols met a similar fate. It published in 1921 a proposed notation for vector quantities, which aroused at once and from many sides the most violent opposition.

== Rectangular coordinates ==
Rectangle

Rectangular cuboid

Given a Cartesian coordinate system, a vector may be specified by its Cartesian coordinates.

=== Tuple notation ===
A vector v in n-dimensional real coordinate space can be specified using a tuple (ordered list) of coordinates:

$$\mathbf{v} = (v_1, v_2, \dots, v_{n - 1}, v_n)$$

Sometimes angle brackets $\langle \dots \rangle$ are used instead of parentheses.

=== Matrix notation ===
A vector in $\mathbb{R}^n$ can also be specified as a row or column matrix containing the ordered set of components. A vector specified as a row matrix is known as a row vector; one specified as a column matrix is known as a column vector.

Again, an n-dimensional vector $\mathbf{v}$ can be specified in either of the following forms using matrices:

- $$\mathbf{v} = \begin{bmatrix} v_1 & v_2 & \cdots & v_{n - 1} & v_n \end{bmatrix} = \begin{pmatrix} v_1 & v_2 & \cdots & v_{n - 1} & v_n \end{pmatrix}$$
- $$\mathbf{v} = \begin{bmatrix} v_1 \\ v_2 \\ \vdots \\ v_{n - 1} \\ v_n \end{bmatrix} =  \begin{pmatrix} v_1 \\ v_2 \\ \vdots \\ v_{n - 1} \\ v_n \end{pmatrix}$$

where v_{1}, v_{2}, …, v_{n − 1}, v_{n} are the components of v. In some advanced contexts, a row and a column vector have different meaning; see covariance and contravariance of vectors for more.

=== Unit vector notation ===
A vector in $\mathbb{R}^3$ (or fewer dimensions, such as $\mathbb{R}^2$ where v_{z} below is zero) can be specified as the sum of the scalar multiples of the components of the vector with the members of the standard basis in $\mathbb{R}^3$. The basis is represented with the unit vectors $\boldsymbol{\hat{\imath}} = (1, 0, 0)$, $\boldsymbol{\hat{\jmath}} = (0, 1, 0)$, and $\boldsymbol{\hat{k}} = (0, 0, 1)$.

A three-dimensional vector $\boldsymbol{v}$ can be specified in the following form, using unit vector notation:
$$\mathbf{v} = v_x \boldsymbol{\hat{\imath}} + v_y \boldsymbol{\hat{\jmath}} + v_z \boldsymbol{\hat{k}}$$

where v_{x}, v_{y}, and v_{z} are the scalar components of v. Scalar components may be positive or negative; the absolute value of a scalar component is its magnitude.

== Polar coordinates ==
Points in the polar coordinate system with pole O and polar axis L. In green, the point with radial coordinate 3 and angular coordinate 60 degrees, or (3,60°). In blue, the point (4,210°).

The two polar coordinates of a point in a plane may be considered as a two dimensional vector. Such a vector consists of a magnitude (or length) and a direction (or angle). The magnitude, typically represented as r, is the distance from a starting point, the origin, to the point which is represented. The angle, typically represented as θ (the Greek letter theta), is the angle, usually measured counterclockwise, between a fixed direction, typically that of the positive x-axis, and the direction from the origin to the point. The angle is typically reduced to lie within the range $0 \le \theta < 2\pi$ radians or $0 \le \theta < 360^{\circ}$.

=== Ordered set and matrix notations ===
Vectors can be specified using either ordered pair notation (a subset of ordered set notation using only two components), or matrix notation, as with rectangular coordinates. In these forms, the first component of the vector is r (instead of v_{1}), and the second component is θ (instead of v_{2}). To differentiate polar coordinates from rectangular coordinates, the angle may be prefixed with the angle symbol, $\angle$.

Two-dimensional polar coordinates for v can be represented as any of the following, using either ordered pair or matrix notation:

- $\mathbf{v} = (r, \angle \theta)$
- $\mathbf{v} = \langle r, \angle \theta \rangle$
- $$\mathbf{v} = \begin{bmatrix} r & \angle \theta \end{bmatrix}$$
- $$\mathbf{v} = \begin{bmatrix} r \\ \angle \theta \end{bmatrix}$$

where r is the magnitude, θ is the angle, and the angle symbol ($\angle$) is optional.

=== Direct notation ===
Vectors can also be specified using simplified autonomous equations that define r and θ explicitly. This can be unwieldy, but is useful for avoiding the confusion with two-dimensional rectangular vectors that arises from using ordered pair or matrix notation.

A two-dimensional vector whose magnitude is 5 units, and whose direction is π/9 radians (20°), can be specified using either of the following forms:

- $r=5, \ \theta={\pi \over 9}$
- $r=5, \ \theta=20^{\circ}$

== Cylindrical vectors ==
A cylindrical coordinate system with origin O, polar axis A, and longitudinal axis L. The dot is the point with radial distance ρ = 4, angular coordinate φ = 130°, and height z = 4.

A cylindrical vector is an extension of the concept of polar coordinates into three dimensions. It is akin to an arrow in the cylindrical coordinate system. A cylindrical vector is specified by a distance in the xy-plane, an angle, and a distance from the xy-plane (a height). The first distance, usually represented as r or ρ (the Greek letter rho), is the magnitude of the projection of the vector onto the xy-plane. The angle, usually represented as θ or φ (the Greek letter phi), is measured as the offset from the line collinear with the x-axis in the positive direction; the angle is typically reduced to lie within the range $0 \le \theta < 2\pi$. The second distance, usually represented as h or z, is the distance from the xy-plane to the endpoint of the vector.

=== Ordered set and matrix notations ===
Cylindrical vectors use polar coordinates, where the second distance component is concatenated as a third component to form ordered triplets (again, a subset of ordered set notation) and matrices. The angle may be prefixed with the angle symbol ($\angle$); the distance-angle-distance combination distinguishes cylindrical vectors in this notation from spherical vectors in similar notation.

A three-dimensional cylindrical vector v can be represented as any of the following, using either ordered triplet or matrix notation:

- $\mathbf{v} = (r, \angle \theta, h)$
- $\mathbf{v} = \langle r, \angle \theta, h \rangle$
- $$\mathbf{v} = \begin{bmatrix} r & \angle \theta & h \end{bmatrix}$$
- $$\mathbf{v} = \begin{bmatrix} r \\ \angle \theta \\ h \end{bmatrix}$$

Where r is the magnitude of the projection of v onto the xy-plane, θ is the angle between the positive x-axis and v, and h is the height from the xy-plane to the endpoint of v. Again, the angle symbol ($\angle$) is optional.

=== Direct notation ===
A cylindrical vector can also be specified directly, using simplified autonomous equations that define r (or ρ), θ (or φ), and h (or z). Consistency should be used when choosing the names to use for the variables; ρ should not be mixed with θ and so on.

A three-dimensional vector, the magnitude of whose projection onto the xy-plane is 5 units, whose angle from the positive x-axis is π/9 radians (20°), and whose height from the xy-plane is 3 units can be specified in any of the following forms:

- $r=5, \ \theta={\pi \over 9}, \ h=3$
- $r=5, \ \theta=20^{\circ}, \ h=3$
- $\rho=5, \ \phi={\pi \over 9}, \ z=3$
- $\rho=5, \ \phi=20^{\circ}, \ z=3$

== Spherical vectors ==
Spherical coordinates (r, θ, φ) as often used in mathematics: radial distance r, azimuthal angle θ, and polar angle φ. The meanings of θ and φ have been swapped compared to the physics convention.

A spherical vector is another method for extending the concept of polar vectors into three dimensions. It is akin to an arrow in the spherical coordinate system. A spherical vector is specified by a magnitude, an azimuth angle, and a zenith angle. The magnitude is usually represented as ρ. The azimuth angle, usually represented as θ, is the (counterclockwise) offset from the positive x-axis. The zenith angle, usually represented as φ, is the offset from the positive z-axis. Both angles are typically reduced to lie within the range from zero (inclusive) to 2π (exclusive).

=== Ordered set and matrix notations ===
Spherical vectors are specified like polar vectors, where the zenith angle is concatenated as a third component to form ordered triplets and matrices. The azimuth and zenith angles may be both prefixed with the angle symbol ($\angle$); the prefix should be used consistently to produce the distance-angle-angle combination that distinguishes spherical vectors from cylindrical ones.

A three-dimensional spherical vector v can be represented as any of the following, using either ordered triplet or matrix notation:

- $\mathbf{v} = (\rho, \angle \theta, \angle \phi)$
- $\mathbf{v} = \langle \rho, \angle \theta, \angle \phi \rangle$
- $$\mathbf{v} = \begin{bmatrix} \rho & \angle \theta & \angle \phi \end{bmatrix}$$
- $$\mathbf{v} = \begin{bmatrix} \rho \\ \angle \theta \\ \angle \phi \end{bmatrix}$$

Where ρ is the magnitude, θ is the azimuth angle, and φ is the zenith angle.

=== Direct notation ===
Like polar and cylindrical vectors, spherical vectors can be specified using simplified autonomous equations, in this case for ρ, θ, and φ.

A three-dimensional vector whose magnitude is 5 units, whose azimuth angle is π/9 radians (20°), and whose zenith angle is π/4 radians (45°) can be specified as:

- $\rho=5, \ \theta={\pi \over 9}, \ \phi={\pi \over 4}$
- $\rho=5, \ \theta=20^{\circ}, \ \phi=45^{\circ}$

== Operations ==
In any given vector space, the operations of vector addition and scalar multiplication are defined. Normed vector spaces also define an operation known as the norm (or determination of magnitude). Inner product spaces also define an operation known as the inner product. In $\mathbb{R}^n$, the inner product is known as the dot product. In $\mathbb{R}^3$ and $\mathbb{R}^7$, an additional operation known as the cross product is also defined.

=== Vector addition ===
Vector addition is represented with the plus sign used as an operator between two vectors. The sum of two vectors u and v would be represented as:
$$\mathbf{u} + \mathbf{v}$$

=== Scalar multiplication ===
Scalar multiplication is represented in the same manners as algebraic multiplication. A scalar beside a vector (either or both of which may be in parentheses) implies scalar multiplication. The two common operators, a dot and a rotated cross, are also acceptable (although the rotated cross is almost never used), but they risk confusion with dot products and cross products, which operate on two vectors. The product of a scalar k with a vector v can be represented in any of the following fashions:

- $k \mathbf{v}$
- $k \cdot \mathbf{v}$

==== Vector subtraction and scalar division ====
Using the algebraic properties of subtraction and division, along with scalar multiplication, it is also possible to “subtract” two vectors and “divide” a vector by a scalar.

Vector subtraction is performed by adding the scalar multiple of −1 with the second vector operand to the first vector operand. This can be represented by the use of the minus sign as an operator. The difference between two vectors u and v can be represented in either of the following fashions:

- $\mathbf{u} + -\mathbf{v}$
- $\mathbf{u} - \mathbf{v}$

Scalar division is performed by multiplying the vector operand with the multiplicative inverse of the scalar operand. This can be represented by the use of the fraction bar or division signs as operators. The quotient of a vector v and a scalar c can be represented in any of the following forms:

- ${1 \over c} \mathbf{v}$
- ${\mathbf{v} \over c}$
- ${\mathbf{v} \div c}$

=== Norm ===
The norm of a vector is represented with double bars on both sides of the vector. The norm of a vector v can be represented as:
$$\|\mathbf{v}\|$$

The norm is also sometimes represented with single bars, like $|\mathbf{v}|$, but this can be confused with absolute value (which is a type of norm).

=== Inner product ===
The inner product of two vectors (also known as the scalar product, not to be confused with scalar multiplication) is represented as an ordered pair enclosed in angle brackets. The inner product of two vectors u and v would be represented as:
$$\langle \mathbf{u}, \mathbf{v} \rangle$$

==== Dot product ====
In $\mathbb{R}^n$, the inner product is also known as the dot product. In addition to the standard inner product notation, the dot product notation (using the dot as an operator) can also be used (and is more common). The dot product of two vectors u and v can be represented as:
$$\mathbf{u} \cdot \mathbf{v}$$

In some older literature, the dot product is implied between two vectors written side-by-side. This notation can be confused with the dyadic product between two vectors.

=== Cross product ===
The cross product of two vectors (in $\mathbb{R}^3$) is represented using the rotated cross as an operator. The cross product of two vectors u and v would be represented as:
$$\mathbf{u} \times \mathbf{v}$$

By some conventions (e.g. in France and in some areas of higher mathematics), this is also denoted by a wedge, which avoids confusion with the wedge product since the two are functionally equivalent in three dimensions:
$$\mathbf{u} \wedge \mathbf{v}$$

In some older literature, the following notation is used for the cross product between u and v:
$$[\mathbf{u},\mathbf{v}]$$

== Nabla ==
Vector notation is used with calculus through the Nabla operator:
$$\mathbf{i}\frac{\partial}{\partial x} + \mathbf{j}\frac{\partial}{\partial y} + \mathbf{k}\frac{\partial}{\partial z}$$
With a scalar function f, the gradient is written as $\nabla f \, ,$

with a vector field F, the divergence is written as $\nabla \cdot F ,$

and with a vector field F, the curl is written as $\nabla \times F .$

== See also ==
- Euclidean vector
- ISO 31-11 § Vectors and tensors
- Phasor
