= Equipollence =

Equipollence may refer to:

- Equinumerosity in set theory, the state of having the same cardinality
- Equipollence (geometry)

== See also ==
- Equipollent or equivalent canonization
