= Line segment =

Part of a straight line that is bounded by two distinct end points

The geometric definition of a closed line segment: the intersection of all points at or to the right of A with all points at or to the left of B

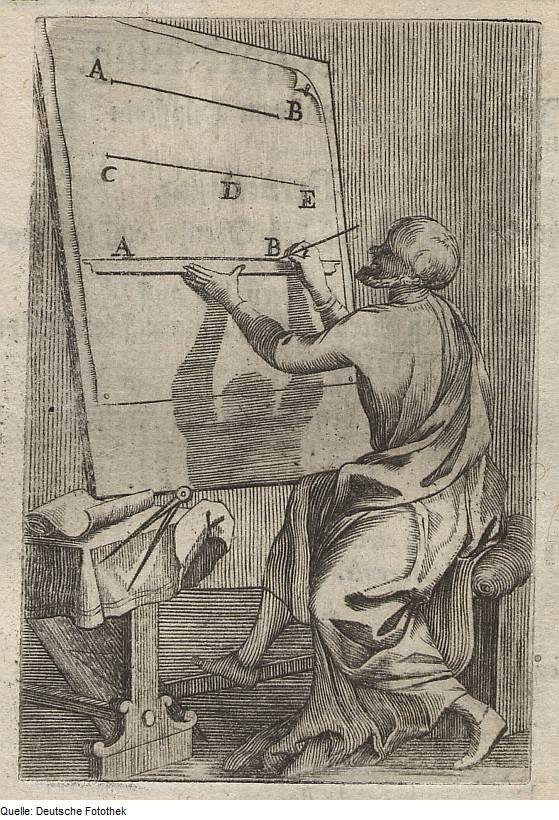
Historical image of 1699 - creating a line segment

In geometry, a line segment is a part of a straight line that is bounded by two distinct endpoints (its extreme points), and contains every point on the line that is between its endpoints. It is a special case of an arc, with zero curvature. The length of a line segment is given by the Euclidean distance between its endpoints. A closed line segment includes both endpoints, while an open line segment excludes both endpoints; a half-open line segment includes exactly one of the endpoints. In geometry, a line segment is often denoted using an overline (vinculum) above the symbols for the two endpoints, such as in A̅B̅. The infinite line containing a line segment is sometimes called the segment's supporting line.

Examples of line segments include the sides of a triangle or square. More generally, when both of the segment's end points are vertices of a polygon or polyhedron, the line segment is either an edge (of that polygon or polyhedron) if they are adjacent vertices, or a diagonal. When the end points both lie on a curve (such as a circle), a line segment is called a chord (of that curve).

== In real or complex vector spaces ==
If V is a vector space over $\R$ or $\C,$ and L is a subset of V, then L is a line segment if L can be parameterized as

$$L = \{ \mathbf{u} + t\mathbf{v} \mid t \in [0,1]\}$$

for some vectors $\mathbf{u}, \mathbf{v} \in V$ where v is nonzero. The endpoints of L are then the vectors u and u + v.

Sometimes, one needs to distinguish between "open" and "closed" line segments. In this case, one would define a closed line segment as above, and an open line segment as a subset L that can be parametrized as

$$L = \{ \mathbf{u}+t\mathbf{v} \mid t\in(0,1)\}$$

for some vectors $\mathbf{u}, \mathbf{v} \in V.$

Equivalently, a line segment is the convex hull of two points. Thus, the line segment can be expressed as a convex combination of the segment's two end points.

In geometry, one might define point B to be between two other points A and C, if the distance |AB| added to the distance |BC| is equal to the distance |AC|. Thus in $\R^2,$ the line segment with endpoints $A=(a_x,a_y)$ and $C=(c_x,c_y)$ is the following collection of points:

$$\Biggl\{ (x,y) \mid \sqrt{(x-c_x)^2 + (y-c_y)^2} + \sqrt{(x-a_x)^2 + (y-a_y)^2} = \sqrt{(c_x-a_x)^2 + (c_y-a_y)^2} \Biggr\} .$$

== Properties ==
- A line segment is a connected, non-empty set.
- If V is a topological vector space, then a closed line segment is a closed set in V. However, an open line segment is an open set in V if and only if V is one-dimensional.
- More generally than above, the concept of a line segment can be defined in an ordered geometry.
- A pair of line segments can be any one of the following: intersecting, parallel, skew, or none of these. The last possibility is a way that line segments differ from lines: if two nonparallel lines are in the same Euclidean plane then they must cross each other, but that need not be true of segments.

== In proofs ==
In an axiomatic treatment of geometry, the notion of betweenness is either assumed to satisfy a certain number of axioms, or defined in terms of an isometry of a line (used as a coordinate system).

Segments play an important role in other theories. For example, in a convex set, the segment that joins any two points of the set is contained in the set. This is important because it transforms some of the analysis of convex sets, to the analysis of a line segment. The segment addition postulate can be used to add congruent segment or segments with equal lengths, and consequently substitute other segments into another statement to make segments congruent.

== As a degenerate ellipse ==
A line segment can be viewed as a degenerate case of an ellipse, in which the semiminor axis goes to zero, the foci go to the endpoints, and the eccentricity goes to one. A standard definition of an ellipse is the set of points for which the sum of a point's distances to two foci is a constant; if this constant equals the distance between the foci, the line segment is the result. A complete orbit of this ellipse traverses the line segment twice. As a degenerate orbit, this is a radial elliptic trajectory.

== In other geometric shapes ==
In addition to appearing as the edges and diagonals of polygons and polyhedra, line segments also appear in numerous other locations relative to other geometric shapes.

=== Triangles ===
Some very frequently considered segments in a triangle to include the three altitudes (each perpendicularly connecting a side or its extension to the opposite vertex), the three medians (each connecting a side's midpoint to the opposite vertex), the perpendicular bisectors of the sides (perpendicularly connecting the midpoint of a side to one of the other sides), and the internal angle bisectors (each connecting a vertex to the opposite side). In each case, there are various equalities relating these segment lengths to others (discussed in the articles on the various types of segment), as well as various inequalities.

Other segments of interest in a triangle include those connecting various triangle centers to each other, most notably the incenter, the circumcenter, the nine-point center, the centroid and the orthocenter.

=== Quadrilaterals ===
In addition to the sides and diagonals of a quadrilateral, some important segments are the two bimedians (connecting the midpoints of opposite sides) and the four maltitudes (each perpendicularly connecting one side to the midpoint of the opposite side).

=== Circles and ellipses ===
Any straight line segment connecting two points on a circle or ellipse is called a chord. Any chord in a circle which has no longer chord is called a diameter, and any segment connecting the circle's center (the midpoint of a diameter) to a point on the circle is called a radius.

In an ellipse, the longest chord, which is also the longest diameter, is called the major axis, and a segment from the midpoint of the major axis (the ellipse's center) to either endpoint of the major axis is called a semi-major axis. Similarly, the shortest diameter of an ellipse is called the minor axis, and the segment from its midpoint (the ellipse's center) to either of its endpoints is called a semi-minor axis. The chords of an ellipse which are perpendicular to the major axis and pass through one of its foci are called the latera recta of the ellipse. The interfocal segment connects the two foci.

== Directed line segment ==
When a line segment is given an orientation (direction) it is called a directed line segment or oriented line segment. It suggests a translation or displacement (perhaps caused by a force). The magnitude and direction are indicative of a potential change. Extending a directed line segment semi-infinitely produces a directed half-line and infinitely in both directions produces a directed line. This suggestion has been absorbed into mathematical physics through the concept of a Euclidean vector. The collection of all directed line segments is usually reduced by making equipollent any pair having the same length and orientation. This application of an equivalence relation was introduced by Giusto Bellavitis in 1835.

== Generalizations ==
Analogous to straight line segments above, one can also define arcs as segments of a curve.

In one-dimensional space, a ball is a line segment.

An oriented plane segment or bivector generalizes the directed line segment.

Beyond Euclidean geometry, geodesic segments play the role of line segments.

A line segment is a one-dimensional simplex; a two-dimensional simplex is a triangle.

A line segment is a one-dimensional hypercube; a two-dimensional hypercube is a square.

== Types of line segments ==
- Chord (geometry)
- Diameter
- Radius

== See also ==
- Polygonal chain
- Interval (mathematics)
- Line segment intersection, the algorithmic problem of finding intersecting pairs in a collection of line segments
