= Segment addition postulate =

Postulate in geometry

In geometry, the segment addition postulate states that given 2 points A and C, a third point B lies on the line segment AC if and only if the distances between the points satisfy the equation AB + BC = AC. This is related to the triangle inequality, which states that AB + BC $\geq$ AC with equality if and only if A, B, and C are collinear (on the same line). This in turn is equivalent to the proposition that the shortest distance between two points lies on a straight line.

The segment addition postulate is often useful in proving results on the congruence of segments.
