= Scalar projection =

Mathematics visualization

If 0° ≤ θ ≤ 90°, as in this case, the scalar projection of a on b coincides with the length of the vector projection.

Vector projection of a on b (a_{1}), and vector rejection of a from b (a_{2}).

In mathematics, the scalar projection of a vector $\mathbf{a}$ on (or onto) a vector $\mathbf{b},$ also known as the scalar resolute of $\mathbf{a}$ in the direction of $\mathbf{b},$ is given by:

$$s = \left\|\mathbf{a}\right\|\cos\theta = \mathbf{a}\cdot\mathbf{\hat b},$$

where the operator $\cdot$ denotes a dot product, $\hat{\mathbf{b}}$ is the unit vector in the direction of $\mathbf{b},$ $\left\|\mathbf{a}\right\|$ is the length of $\mathbf{a},$ and $\theta$ is the angle between $\mathbf{a}$ and $\mathbf{b}$.

The term scalar component refers sometimes to scalar projection, as, in Cartesian coordinates, the components of a vector are the scalar projections in the directions of the coordinate axes.

The scalar projection is a scalar, equal to the length of the orthogonal projection of $\mathbf{a}$ on $\mathbf{b}$, with a negative sign if the projection has an opposite direction with respect to $\mathbf{b}$.

Multiplying the scalar projection of $\mathbf{a}$ on $\mathbf{b}$ by $\mathbf{\hat b}$ converts it into the above-mentioned orthogonal projection, also called vector projection of $\mathbf{a}$ on $\mathbf{b}$.

== Definition based on angle θ ==
If the angle $\theta$ between $\mathbf{a}$ and $\mathbf{b}$ is known, the scalar projection of $\mathbf{a}$ on $\mathbf{b}$ can be computed using

$s = \left\|\mathbf{a}\right\| \cos \theta .$ ($s = \left\|\mathbf{a}_1\right\|$ in the figure)

The formula above can be inverted to obtain the angle, θ.

== Definition in terms of a and b ==
When $\theta$ is not known, the cosine of $\theta$ can be computed in terms of $\mathbf{a}$ and $\mathbf{b},$ by the following property of the dot product $\mathbf{a} \cdot \mathbf{b}$:

$$\frac {\mathbf{a} \cdot \mathbf{b}} {\left\|\mathbf{a}\right\| \left\|\mathbf{b}\right\|} = \cos \theta$$

By this property, the definition of the scalar projection $s$ becomes:

$$s = \left\|\mathbf{a}_1\right\| = \left\|\mathbf{a}\right\| \cos \theta = \left\|\mathbf{a}\right\| \frac {\mathbf{a} \cdot \mathbf{b}} {\left\|\mathbf{a}\right\| \left\|\mathbf{b}\right\|} = \frac {\mathbf{a} \cdot \mathbf{b}} {\left\|\mathbf{b}\right\| }\,$$

== Properties ==
The scalar projection has a negative sign if $90^\circ < \theta \le 180^\circ$. It coincides with the length of the corresponding vector projection if the angle is smaller than 90°. More exactly, if the vector projection is denoted $\mathbf{a}_1$ and its length $\left\|\mathbf{a}_1\right\|$:

$s = \left\|\mathbf{a}_1\right\|$ if $0^\circ \le \theta \le 90^\circ,$
$s = -\left\|\mathbf{a}_1\right\|$ if $90^\circ < \theta \le 180^\circ.$

== See also ==
- Scalar product
- Cross product
- Vector projection

== Sources ==
- Dot products - www.mit.org
- Scalar projection - Flexbooks.ck12.org
- Scalar Projection & Vector Projection - medium.com
- Lesson Explainer: Scalar Projection | Nagwa
