= Euclidean vector =

Geometric object that has length and direction

A vector $\stackrel \rightarrow{a}$ pointing from point A to point B

In mathematics, physics, and engineering, a Euclidean vector or simply a vector (sometimes called a geometric vector or spatial vector) is a geometric object that has magnitude (or length) and direction. Euclidean vectors can be added and scaled to form a vector space. A vector quantity is a vector-valued physical quantity, including units of measurement and possibly a support, formulated as a directed line segment. A vector is frequently depicted graphically as an arrow connecting an initial point A with a terminal point B, and denoted by $\stackrel \longrightarrow{AB}.$

A vector is what is needed to "carry" the point A to the point B; the Latin word vector means 'carrier'. It was first used by 18th century astronomers investigating planetary revolution around the Sun. The magnitude of the vector is the distance between the two points, and the direction refers to the direction of displacement from A to B. Many algebraic operations on real numbers such as addition, subtraction, multiplication, and negation have close analogues for vectors, operations which obey the familiar algebraic laws of commutativity, associativity, and distributivity. These operations and associated laws qualify Euclidean vectors as an example of the more generalized concept of vectors defined simply as elements of a vector space.

Vectors play an important role in physics: the velocity and acceleration of a moving object and the forces acting on it can all be described with vectors. Many other physical quantities can be usefully thought of as vectors. Although most of them do not represent distances (except, for example, position or displacement), their magnitude and direction can still be represented by the length and direction of an arrow. The mathematical representation of a physical vector depends on the coordinate system used to describe it. Other vector-like mathematical objects that describe physical quantities, such as pseudovectors and tensors, transform in a similar way under changes of the coordinate system.

== History ==
The vector concept, as it is known today, is the result of a gradual development over a period of more than 200 years. About a dozen people contributed significantly to its development. In 1835, Giusto Bellavitis abstracted the basic idea when he established the concept of equipollence. Working in a Euclidean plane, he made equipollent any pair of parallel line segments of the same length and orientation. Essentially, he realized an equivalence relation on the pairs of points (bipoints) in the plane, and thus erected the first space of vectors in the plane. The term vector was introduced by William Rowan Hamilton as part of a quaternion, which is a sum q = s + v of a real number s (also called scalar) and a 3-dimensional vector. Like Bellavitis, Hamilton viewed vectors as representative of classes of equipollent directed segments. As complex numbers use an imaginary unit to complement the real line, Hamilton considered the vector v to be the imaginary part of a quaternion:

The algebraically imaginary part, being geometrically constructed by a straight line, or radius vector, which has, in general, for each determined quaternion, a determined length and determined direction in space, may be called the vector part, or simply the vector of the quaternion.

Several other mathematicians developed vector-like systems in the middle of the nineteenth century, including Augustin Cauchy, Hermann Grassmann, August Möbius, Comte de Saint-Venant, and Matthew O'Brien. Grassmann's 1840 work Theorie der Ebbe und Flut (Theory of the Ebb and Flow) was the first system of spatial analysis that is similar to today's system, and had ideas corresponding to the cross product, scalar product and vector differentiation. Grassmann's work was largely neglected until the 1870s. Peter Guthrie Tait carried the quaternion standard after Hamilton. His 1867 Elementary Treatise of Quaternions included extensive treatment of the nabla or del operator ∇. In 1878, Elements of Dynamic was published by William Kingdon Clifford. Clifford simplified the quaternion study by isolating the dot product and cross product of two vectors from the complete quaternion product. This approach made vector calculations available to engineers—and others working in three dimensions and skeptical of the fourth.

Josiah Willard Gibbs, who was exposed to quaternions through James Clerk Maxwell's Treatise on Electricity and Magnetism, separated off their vector part for independent treatment. The first half of Gibbs's Elements of Vector Analysis, published in 1881, presents what is essentially the modern system of vector analysis. In 1901, Edwin Bidwell Wilson published Vector Analysis, adapted from Gibbs's lectures, which banished any mention of quaternions in the development of vector calculus.

== Overview ==
In physics and engineering, a vector is typically regarded as a geometric entity characterized by a magnitude and a direction. It is formally defined as a directed line segment, or arrow, in a Euclidean space. In pure mathematics, a vector is defined more generally as any element of a vector space. In this context, vectors are abstract entities which may or may not be characterized by a magnitude and a direction. This generalized definition implies that the above-mentioned geometric entities are a special kind of abstract vectors, as they are elements of a special kind of vector space called Euclidean space. This particular article is about vectors strictly defined as arrows in Euclidean space. When it becomes necessary to distinguish these special vectors from vectors as defined in pure mathematics, they are sometimes referred to as geometric, spatial, or Euclidean vectors.

Two arrows $\stackrel {\,\longrightarrow}{AB}$ and $\stackrel {\,\longrightarrow}{A'B'}$ in space represent the same free vector if they have the same magnitude and direction: that is, they are equipollent if the quadrilateral ABB′A′ is a parallelogram. If the Euclidean space is equipped with a choice of origin, then a free vector is equivalent to the bound vector of the same magnitude and direction whose initial point is the origin.

The term vector also has generalizations to higher dimensions, and to more formal approaches with much wider applications.

=== Further information ===
In classical Euclidean geometry (i.e., synthetic geometry), vectors were introduced (during the 19th century) as equivalence classes under equipollence of ordered pairs of points; two pairs (A, B) and (C, D) being equipollent if the points A, B, D, C, in this order, form a parallelogram. Such an equivalence class is called a vector, more precisely, a Euclidean vector. The equivalence class of (A, B) is often denoted $\overrightarrow{AB}.$

A Euclidean vector is thus an equivalence class of directed segments with the same magnitude (e.g., the length of the line segment (A, B)) and same direction (e.g., the direction from A to B). In physics, Euclidean vectors are used to represent physical quantities that have both magnitude and direction, but are not located at a specific place, in contrast to scalars, which have no direction. For example, velocity, forces and acceleration are represented by vectors.

In modern geometry, Euclidean spaces are often defined from linear algebra. More precisely, a Euclidean space E is defined as a set to which is associated an inner product space of finite dimension over the reals $\overrightarrow{E},$ and a group action of the additive group of $\overrightarrow{E},$ which is free and transitive (See Affine space for details of this construction). The elements of $\overrightarrow{E}$ are called translations. It has been proven that the two definitions of Euclidean spaces are equivalent, and that the equivalence classes under equipollence may be identified with translations.

Sometimes, Euclidean vectors are considered without reference to a Euclidean space. In this case, a Euclidean vector is an element of a normed vector space of finite dimension over the reals, or, typically, an element of the real coordinate space $\mathbb R^n$ equipped with the dot product. This makes sense, as the addition in such a vector space acts freely and transitively on the vector space itself. That is, $\mathbb R^n$ is a Euclidean space, with itself as an associated vector space, and the dot product as an inner product.

The Euclidean space $\mathbb R^n$ is often presented as the standard Euclidean space of dimension n. This is motivated by the fact that every Euclidean space of dimension n is isomorphic to the Euclidean space $\mathbb R^n.$ More precisely, given such a Euclidean space, one may choose any point O as an origin. By Gram–Schmidt process, one may also find an orthonormal basis of the associated vector space (a basis such that the inner product of two basis vectors is 0 if they are different and 1 if they are equal). This defines Cartesian coordinates of any point P of the space, as the coordinates on this basis of the vector $\overrightarrow{OP}.$ These choices define an isomorphism of the given Euclidean space onto $\mathbb R^n,$ by mapping any point to the n-tuple of its Cartesian coordinates, and every vector to its coordinate vector.

=== Examples in one dimension ===
Since the physicist's concept of force has a direction and a magnitude, it may be seen as a vector. As an example, consider a rightward force F of 15 newtons. If the positive axis is also directed rightward, then F is represented by the vector 15 N, and if positive points leftward, then the vector for F is −15 N. In either case, the magnitude of the vector is 15 N. Likewise, the vector representation of a displacement Δs of 4 meters would be 4 m or −4 m, depending on its direction, and its magnitude would be 4 m regardless.

=== In physics and engineering ===
Vectors are fundamental in the physical sciences. They can be used to represent any quantity that has magnitude, has direction, and which adheres to the rules of vector addition. An example is velocity, the magnitude of which is speed. For instance, the velocity 5 meters per second upward could be represented by the vector (0, 5) (in 2 dimensions with the positive y-axis as 'up'). Another quantity represented by a vector is force, since it has a magnitude and direction and follows the rules of vector addition. Vectors also describe many other physical quantities, such as linear displacement, displacement, linear acceleration, angular acceleration, linear momentum, and angular momentum. Other physical vectors, such as the electric and magnetic field, are represented as a system of vectors at each point of a physical space; that is, a vector field. Examples of quantities that have magnitude and direction, but fail to follow the rules of vector addition, are angular displacement and electric current. Consequently, these are not vectors.

=== In Cartesian space ===
In the Cartesian coordinate system, a bound vector can be represented by identifying the coordinates of its initial and terminal point. For instance, the points A = (1, 0, 0) and B = (0, 1, 0) in space determine the bound vector $\overrightarrow{AB}$ pointing from the point x = 1 on the x-axis to the point y = 1 on the y-axis.

In Cartesian coordinates, a free vector may be thought of in terms of a corresponding bound vector, in this sense, whose initial point has the coordinates of the origin O = (0, 0, 0). It is then determined by the coordinates of that bound vector's terminal point. Thus the free vector represented by (1, 0, 0) is a vector of unit length—pointing along the direction of the positive x-axis.

This coordinate representation of free vectors allows their algebraic features to be expressed in a convenient numerical fashion. For example, the sum of the two (free) vectors (1, 2, 3) and (−2, 0, 4) is the (free) vector
$$(1, 2, 3) + (-2, 0, 4) = (1-2, 2+0, 3+4) = (-1, 2, 7)\,.$$

=== Euclidean and affine vectors ===
In the geometrical and physical settings, it is sometimes possible to associate, in a natural way, a length or magnitude and a direction to vectors. In addition, the notion of direction is strictly associated with the notion of an angle between two vectors. If the dot product of two vectors is defined—a scalar-valued product of two vectors—then it is also possible to define a length; the dot product gives a convenient algebraic characterization of both angle (a function of the dot product between any two non-zero vectors) and length (the square root of the dot product of a vector by itself). In three dimensions, it is further possible to define the cross product, which supplies an algebraic characterization of the area and orientation in space of the parallelogram defined by two vectors (used as sides of the parallelogram). In any dimension (and, in particular, higher dimensions), it is possible to define the exterior product, which (among other things) supplies an algebraic characterization of the area and orientation in space of the n-dimensional parallelotope defined by n vectors.

In a pseudo-Euclidean space, a vector's squared length can be positive, negative, or zero. An important example is Minkowski space (which is important to our understanding of special relativity).

However, it is not always possible or desirable to define the length of a vector. This more general type of spatial vector is the subject of vector spaces (for free vectors) and affine spaces (for bound vectors, as each represented by an ordered pair of "points"). One physical example comes from thermodynamics, where many quantities of interest can be considered vectors in a space with no notion of length or angle.

=== Generalizations ===
In physics, as well as mathematics, a vector is often identified with a tuple of components, or list of numbers, that act as scalar coefficients for a set of basis vectors. When the basis is transformed, for example by rotation or stretching, then the components of any vector in terms of that basis also transform in an opposite sense. The vector itself has not changed, but the basis has, so the components of the vector must change to compensate. The vector is called covariant or contravariant, depending on how the transformation of the vector's components is related to the transformation of the basis. In general, contravariant vectors are "regular vectors" with units of distance (such as a displacement), or distance times some other unit (such as velocity or acceleration); covariant vectors, on the other hand, have units of one-over-distance such as gradient. If you change units (a special case of a change of basis) from meters to millimeters, a scale factor of 1/1000, a displacement of 1 m becomes 1000 mm—a contravariant change in numerical value. In contrast, a gradient of 1 K/m becomes 0.001 K/mm—a covariant change in value (for more, see covariance and contravariance of vectors). Tensors are another type of quantity that behave in this way; a vector is one type of tensor.

In pure mathematics, a vector is any element of a vector space over some field and is often represented as a coordinate vector. The vectors described in this article are a very special case of this general definition, because they are contravariant with respect to the ambient space. Contravariance captures the physical intuition behind the idea that a vector has "magnitude and direction".

== Representations ==
Vector arrow pointing from A to B

Vectors are usually denoted in lowercase boldface, as in $\mathbf{u}$, $\mathbf{v}$ and $\mathbf{w}$, or in lowercase italic boldface, as in a. (Uppercase letters are typically used to represent matrices.) Other conventions include $\vec{a}$ or a, especially in handwriting. Alternatively, some use a tilde (~) or a wavy underline drawn beneath the symbol, e.g. $\underset{^\sim}a$, which is a convention for indicating boldface type. If the vector represents a directed distance or displacement from a point A to a point B (see figure), it can also be denoted as $\stackrel{\longrightarrow}{AB}$ or AB. In German literature, it was especially common to represent vectors with small fraktur letters such as $\mathfrak{a}$.

Vectors are usually shown in graphs or other diagrams as arrows (directed line segments), as illustrated in the figure. Here, the point A is called the origin, tail, base, or initial point, and the point B is called the head, tip, endpoint, terminal point or final point. The length of the arrow is proportional to the vector's magnitude, while the direction in which the arrow points indicates the vector's direction.

On a two-dimensional diagram, a vector perpendicular to the plane of the diagram is sometimes desired. These vectors are commonly shown as small circles. A circle with a dot at its centre (Unicode U+2299 ⊙) indicates a vector pointing out of the front of the diagram, toward the viewer. A circle with a cross inscribed in it (Unicode U+2297 ⊗) indicates a vector pointing into and behind the diagram. These can be thought of as viewing the tip of an arrow head on and viewing the flights of an arrow from the back.

A vector in the Cartesian plane, showing the position of a point A with coordinates (2, 3)

In order to calculate with vectors, the graphical representation may be too cumbersome. Vectors in an n-dimensional Euclidean space can be represented as coordinate vectors in a Cartesian coordinate system. The endpoint of a vector can be identified with an ordered list of n real numbers (n-tuple). These numbers are the coordinates of the endpoint of the vector, with respect to a given Cartesian coordinate system, and are typically called the scalar components (or scalar projections) of the vector on the axes of the coordinate system.

As an example in two dimensions (see figure), the vector from the origin O = (0, 0) to the point A = (2, 3) is simply written as
$$\mathbf{a} = (2,3).$$

The notion that the tail of the vector coincides with the origin is implicit and easily understood. Thus, the more explicit notation $\overrightarrow{OA}$ is usually deemed not necessary (and is indeed rarely used).

In three dimensional Euclidean space (or R^{3}), vectors are identified with triples of scalar components:
$$\mathbf{a} = (a_1, a_2, a_3).$$
also written,
$$\mathbf{a} = (a_x, a_y, a_z).$$

This can be generalised to n-dimensional Euclidean space (or R^{n}).
$$\mathbf{a} = (a_1, a_2, a_3, \ldots, a_{n-1}, a_n).$$

These numbers are often arranged into a column vector or row vector, particularly when dealing with matrices, as follows:
$$\mathbf{a} =
\begin{bmatrix}
a_1\\
a_2\\
a_3\\
\end{bmatrix} =
[ a_1\ a_2\ a_3 ]^{\operatorname{T}}.$$

Another way to represent a vector in n-dimensions is to introduce the standard basis vectors. For instance, in three dimensions, there are three of them:
$${\mathbf e}_1 = (1,0,0),\ {\mathbf e}_2 = (0,1,0),\ {\mathbf e}_3 = (0,0,1).$$
These have the intuitive interpretation as vectors of unit length pointing up the x-, y-, and z-axis of a Cartesian coordinate system, respectively. In terms of these, any vector a in R^{3} can be expressed in the form:
$$\mathbf{a} = (a_1,a_2,a_3) = a_1(1,0,0) + a_2(0,1,0) + a_3(0,0,1), \$$

or
$$\mathbf{a} = \mathbf{a}_1 + \mathbf{a}_2 + \mathbf{a}_3 = a_1{\mathbf e}_1 + a_2{\mathbf e}_2 + a_3{\mathbf e}_3,$$

where a_{1}, a_{2}, a_{3} are called the vector components (or vector projections) of a on the basis vectors or, equivalently, on the corresponding Cartesian axes x, y, and z (see figure), while a_{1}, a_{2}, a_{3} are the respective scalar components (or scalar projections).

In introductory physics textbooks, the standard basis vectors are often denoted $\mathbf{i},\mathbf{j},\mathbf{k}$ instead (or $\mathbf{\hat{x}}, \mathbf{\hat{y}}, \mathbf{\hat{z}}$, in which the hat symbol $\mathbf{\hat{}}$ typically denotes unit vectors). In this case, the scalar and vector components are denoted respectively a_{x}, a_{y}, a_{z}, and a_{x}, a_{y}, a_{z} (note the difference in boldface). Thus,

$$\mathbf{a} = \mathbf{a}_x + \mathbf{a}_y + \mathbf{a}_z = a_x{\mathbf i} + a_y{\mathbf j} + a_z{\mathbf k}.$$

The notation e_{i} is compatible with the index notation and the summation convention commonly used in higher level mathematics, physics, and engineering.

=== Decomposition or resolution ===
As explained above, a vector is often described by a set of vector components that add up to form the given vector. Typically, these components are the projections of the vector on a set of mutually perpendicular reference axes (basis vectors). The vector is said to be decomposed or resolved with respect to that set.

Illustration of tangential and normal components of a vector to a surface.

The decomposition or resolution of a vector into components is not unique, because it depends on the choice of the axes on which the vector is projected.

Moreover, the use of Cartesian unit vectors such as $\mathbf{\hat{x}}, \mathbf{\hat{y}}, \mathbf{\hat{z}}$ as a basis in which to represent a vector is not mandated. Vectors can also be expressed in terms of an arbitrary basis, including the unit vectors of a cylindrical coordinate system ($\boldsymbol{\hat{\rho}}, \boldsymbol{\hat{\phi}}, \mathbf{\hat{z}}$) or spherical coordinate system ($\mathbf{\hat{r}}, \boldsymbol{\hat{\theta}}, \boldsymbol{\hat{\phi}}$). The latter two choices are more convenient for solving problems which possess cylindrical or spherical symmetry, respectively.

The choice of a basis does not affect the properties of a vector or its behaviour under transformations.

A vector can also be broken up with respect to "non-fixed" basis vectors that change their orientation as a function of time or space. For example, a vector in three-dimensional space can be decomposed with respect to two axes, respectively normal, and tangent to a surface (see figure). Moreover, the radial and tangential components of a vector relate to the radius of rotation of an object. The former is parallel to the radius and the latter is orthogonal to it.

In these cases, each of the components may be in turn decomposed with respect to a fixed coordinate system or basis set (e.g., a global coordinate system, or inertial reference frame).

== Properties and operations ==
The following section uses the Cartesian coordinate system with basis vectors
$${\mathbf e}_1 = (1,0,0),\ {\mathbf e}_2 = (0,1,0),\ {\mathbf e}_3 = (0,0,1)$$
and assumes that all vectors have the origin as a common base point. A vector a will be written as
$${\mathbf a} = a_1{\mathbf e}_1 + a_2{\mathbf e}_2 + a_3{\mathbf e}_3.$$

=== Equality ===
Two vectors are said to be equal if they have the same magnitude and direction. Equivalently they will be equal if their coordinates are equal. So two vectors
$${\mathbf a} = a_1{\mathbf e}_1 + a_2{\mathbf e}_2 + a_3{\mathbf e}_3$$
and
$${\mathbf b} = b_1{\mathbf e}_1 + b_2{\mathbf e}_2 + b_3{\mathbf e}_3$$
are equal if
$$a_1 = b_1,\quad a_2=b_2,\quad a_3=b_3.\,$$

=== Opposite, parallel, and antiparallel vectors ===
Two vectors are opposite if they have the same magnitude but opposite direction; so two vectors

$${\mathbf a} = a_1{\mathbf e}_1 + a_2{\mathbf e}_2 + a_3{\mathbf e}_3$$

and

$${\mathbf b} = b_1{\mathbf e}_1 + b_2{\mathbf e}_2 + b_3{\mathbf e}_3$$

are opposite if

$$a_1 = -b_1,\quad a_2=-b_2,\quad a_3=-b_3.\,$$

Two vectors are equidirectional (or codirectional) if they have the same direction but not necessarily the same magnitude. Two vectors are parallel if they have either the same or opposite direction, but not necessarily the same magnitude; two vectors are antiparallel if they have strictly opposite direction, but not necessarily the same magnitude. (Note: "Can be brought to the same straight line by means of parallel displacement".)

=== Addition and subtraction ===
The sum of a and b of two vectors may be defined as
$$\mathbf{a}+\mathbf{b}
=(a_1+b_1)\mathbf{e}_1
+(a_2+b_2)\mathbf{e}_2
+(a_3+b_3)\mathbf{e}_3.$$
The resulting vector is sometimes called the resultant vector of a and b.

The addition may be represented graphically by placing the tail of the arrow b at the head of the arrow a, and then drawing an arrow from the tail of a to the head of b. The new arrow drawn represents the vector a + b, as illustrated below:

The addition of two vectors a and b

This addition method is sometimes called the parallelogram rule because a and b form the sides of a parallelogram and a + b is one of the diagonals. If a and b are bound vectors that have the same base point, this point will also be the base point of a + b. One can check geometrically that a + b = b + a and (a + b) + c = a + (b + c).

The difference of a and b is

$$\mathbf{a}-\mathbf{b}
=(a_1-b_1)\mathbf{e}_1
+(a_2-b_2)\mathbf{e}_2
+(a_3-b_3)\mathbf{e}_3.$$

Subtraction of two vectors can be geometrically illustrated as follows: to subtract b from a, place the tails of a and b at the same point, and then draw an arrow from the head of b to the head of a. This new arrow represents the vector (-b) + a, with (-b) being the opposite of b, see drawing. And (-b) + a = a − b.

The subtraction of two vectors a and b

=== Scalar multiplication ===
Scalar multiplication of a vector by a factor of 3 stretches the vector out.

A vector may also be multiplied, or re-scaled, by any real number r. In the context of conventional vector algebra, these real numbers are often called scalars (from scale) to distinguish them from vectors. The operation of multiplying a vector by a scalar is called scalar multiplication. The resulting vector is

$$r\mathbf{a}=(ra_1)\mathbf{e}_1
+(ra_2)\mathbf{e}_2
+(ra_3)\mathbf{e}_3.$$

Intuitively, multiplying by a scalar r stretches a vector out by a factor of r. Geometrically, this can be visualized (at least in the case when r is an integer) as placing r copies of the vector in a line where the endpoint of one vector is the initial point of the next vector.

If r is negative, then the vector changes direction: it flips around by an angle of 180°. Two examples (r = −1 and r = 2) are given below:

The scalar multiplications −a and 2a of a vector a

Scalar multiplication is distributive over vector addition in the following sense: r(a + b) = ra + rb for all vectors a and b and all scalars r. One can also show that a − b = a + (−1)b.

=== Length ===
The length, magnitude or norm of the vector a is denoted by ‖a‖ or, less commonly, |a|, which is not to be confused with the absolute value (a scalar "norm").

The length of the vector a can be computed with the Euclidean norm,

$$\left\|\mathbf{a}\right\|=\sqrt{a_1^2+a_2^2+a_3^2},$$

which is a consequence of the Pythagorean theorem since the basis vectors e_{1}, e_{2}, e_{3} are orthogonal unit vectors.

This happens to be equal to the square root of the dot product, discussed below, of the vector with itself:

$$\left\|\mathbf{a}\right\|=\sqrt{\mathbf{a}\cdot\mathbf{a}}.$$

==== Unit vector ====
The normalization of a vector a into a unit vector â

A unit vector is any vector with a length of one; normally unit vectors are used simply to indicate direction. A vector of arbitrary length can be divided by its length to create a unit vector. This is known as normalizing a vector. A unit vector is often indicated with a hat as in â.

To normalize a vector a = (a_{1}, a_{2}, a_{3}), scale the vector by the reciprocal of its length ‖a‖. That is:

$$\mathbf{\hat{a}} = \frac{\mathbf{a}}{\left\|\mathbf{a}\right\|} = \frac{a_1}{\left\|\mathbf{a}\right\|}\mathbf{e}_1 + \frac{a_2}{\left\|\mathbf{a}\right\|}\mathbf{e}_2 + \frac{a_3}{\left\|\mathbf{a}\right\|}\mathbf{e}_3$$

==== Zero vector ====
The zero vector is the vector with length zero. Written out in coordinates, the vector is (0, 0, 0), and it is commonly denoted $\vec{0}$, 0, or simply 0. Unlike any other vector, it has an arbitrary or indeterminate direction, and cannot be normalized (that is, there is no unit vector that is a multiple of the zero vector). The sum of the zero vector with any vector a is a (that is, 0 + a = a).

=== Dot product ===
The dot product of two vectors a and b (sometimes called the inner product, or, since its result is a scalar, the scalar product) is denoted by a ∙ b, and is defined as:

$$\mathbf{a}\cdot\mathbf{b}
=\left\|\mathbf{a}\right\|\left\|\mathbf{b}\right\|\cos\theta,$$

where θ is the measure of the angle between a and b (see trigonometric function for an explanation of cosine). Geometrically, this means that a and b are drawn with a common start point, and then the length of a is multiplied with the length of the component of b that points in the same direction as a.

The dot product can also be defined as the sum of the products of the components of each vector as

$$\mathbf{a} \cdot \mathbf{b} = a_1 b_1 + a_2 b_2 + a_3 b_3.$$

=== Cross product ===
The cross product (also called the vector product or outer product) is only meaningful in three or seven dimensions. The cross product differs from the dot product primarily in that the result of the cross product of two vectors is a vector. The cross product, denoted a × b, is a vector perpendicular to both a and b and is defined as

$$\mathbf{a}\times\mathbf{b}
=\left\|\mathbf{a}\right\|\left\|\mathbf{b}\right\|\sin(\theta)\,\mathbf{n}$$

where θ is the measure of the angle between a and b, and n is a unit vector perpendicular to both a and b which completes a right-handed system. The right-handedness constraint is necessary because there exist two unit vectors that are perpendicular to both a and b, namely, n and (−n).

An illustration of the cross product

The cross product a × b is defined so that a, b, and a × b also becomes a right-handed system (although a and b are not necessarily orthogonal). This is the right-hand rule.

The length of a × b can be interpreted as the area of the parallelogram having a and b as sides.

The cross product can be written as
$${\mathbf a}\times{\mathbf b} = (a_2 b_3 - a_3 b_2) {\mathbf e}_1 + (a_3 b_1 - a_1 b_3) {\mathbf e}_2 + (a_1 b_2 - a_2 b_1) {\mathbf e}_3.$$

For arbitrary choices of spatial orientation (that is, allowing for left-handed as well as right-handed coordinate systems) the cross product of two vectors is a pseudovector instead of a vector (see below).

=== Scalar triple product ===
The scalar triple product (also called the box product or mixed triple product) is not really a new operator, but a way of applying the other two multiplication operators to three vectors. The scalar triple product is sometimes denoted by (a b c) and defined as:

$$(\mathbf{a}\ \mathbf{b}\ \mathbf{c})
=\mathbf{a}\cdot(\mathbf{b}\times\mathbf{c}).$$

It has three primary uses. First, the absolute value of the box product is the volume of the parallelepiped which has edges that are defined by the three vectors. Second, the scalar triple product is zero if and only if the three vectors are linearly dependent, which can be easily proved by considering that in order for the three vectors to not make a volume, they must all lie in the same plane. Third, the box product is positive if and only if the three vectors a, b and c are right-handed.

In components (with respect to a right-handed orthonormal basis), if the three vectors are thought of as rows (or columns, but in the same order), the scalar triple product is simply the determinant of the 3-by-3 matrix having the three vectors as rows
$$(\mathbf{a}\ \mathbf{b}\ \mathbf{c})=\begin{vmatrix}
a_1 & a_2 & a_3 \\
b_1 & b_2 & b_3 \\
c_1 & c_2 & c_3 \\
\end{vmatrix}$$

The scalar triple product is linear in all three entries and anti-symmetric in the following sense:
$$(\mathbf{a}\ \mathbf{b}\ \mathbf{c}) = (\mathbf{c}\ \mathbf{a}\ \mathbf{b}) = (\mathbf{b}\ \mathbf{c}\ \mathbf{a})=
-(\mathbf{a}\ \mathbf{c}\ \mathbf{b}) = -(\mathbf{b}\ \mathbf{a}\ \mathbf{c}) = -(\mathbf{c}\ \mathbf{b}\ \mathbf{a}).$$

=== Conversion between multiple Cartesian bases ===
All examples thus far have dealt with vectors expressed in terms of the same basis, namely, the e basis {e_{1}, e_{2}, e_{3}}. However, a vector can be expressed in terms of any number of different bases that are not necessarily aligned with each other, and still remain the same vector. In the e basis, a vector a is expressed, by definition, as

$$\mathbf{a} = p\mathbf{e}_1 + q\mathbf{e}_2 + r\mathbf{e}_3.$$

The scalar components in the e basis are, by definition,

$$\begin{align}
p &= \mathbf{a}\cdot\mathbf{e}_1, \\
q &= \mathbf{a}\cdot\mathbf{e}_2, \\
r &= \mathbf{a}\cdot\mathbf{e}_3.
\end{align}$$

In another orthonormal basis n = {n_{1}, n_{2}, n_{3}} that is not necessarily aligned with e, the vector a is expressed as

$$\mathbf{a} = u\mathbf{n}_1 + v\mathbf{n}_2 + w\mathbf{n}_3$$

and the scalar components in the n basis are, by definition,

$$\begin{align}
u &= \mathbf{a}\cdot\mathbf{n}_1, \\
v &= \mathbf{a}\cdot\mathbf{n}_2, \\
w &= \mathbf{a}\cdot\mathbf{n}_3.
\end{align}$$

The values of p, q, r, and u, v, w relate to the unit vectors in such a way that the resulting vector sum is exactly the same physical vector a in both cases. It is common to encounter vectors known in terms of different bases (for example, one basis fixed to the Earth and a second basis fixed to a moving vehicle). In such a case it is necessary to develop a method to convert between bases so the basic vector operations such as addition and subtraction can be performed. One way to express u, v, w in terms of p, q, r is to use column matrices along with a direction cosine matrix containing the information that relates the two bases. Such an expression can be formed by substitution of the above equations to form

$$\begin{align}
u &= (p\mathbf{e}_1 + q\mathbf{e}_2 + r\mathbf{e}_3)\cdot\mathbf{n}_1, \\
v &= (p\mathbf{e}_1 + q\mathbf{e}_2 + r\mathbf{e}_3)\cdot\mathbf{n}_2, \\
w &= (p\mathbf{e}_1 + q\mathbf{e}_2 + r\mathbf{e}_3)\cdot\mathbf{n}_3.
\end{align}$$

Distributing the dot-multiplication gives

$$\begin{align}
u &= p\mathbf{e}_1\cdot\mathbf{n}_1 + q\mathbf{e}_2\cdot\mathbf{n}_1 + r\mathbf{e}_3\cdot\mathbf{n}_1, \\
v &= p\mathbf{e}_1\cdot\mathbf{n}_2 + q\mathbf{e}_2\cdot\mathbf{n}_2 + r\mathbf{e}_3\cdot\mathbf{n}_2, \\
w &= p\mathbf{e}_1\cdot\mathbf{n}_3 + q\mathbf{e}_2\cdot\mathbf{n}_3 + r\mathbf{e}_3\cdot\mathbf{n}_3.
\end{align}$$

Replacing each dot product with a unique scalar gives

$$\begin{align}
u &= c_{11}p + c_{12}q + c_{13}r, \\
v &= c_{21}p + c_{22}q + c_{23}r, \\
w &= c_{31}p + c_{32}q + c_{33}r,
\end{align}$$

and these equations can be expressed as the single matrix equation

$$\begin{bmatrix} u \\ v \\ w \\ \end{bmatrix} = \begin{bmatrix} c_{11} & c_{12} & c_{13} \\ c_{21} & c_{22} & c_{23} \\ c_{31} & c_{32} & c_{33} \end{bmatrix} \begin{bmatrix} p \\ q \\ r \end{bmatrix}.$$

This matrix equation relates the scalar components of a in the n basis (u,v, and w) with those in the e basis (p, q, and r). Each matrix element c_{jk} is the direction cosine relating n_{j} to e_{k}. The term direction cosine refers to the cosine of the angle between two unit vectors, which is also equal to their dot product. Therefore,

$$\begin{align}
c_{11} &= \mathbf{n}_1\cdot\mathbf{e}_1 \\
c_{12} &= \mathbf{n}_1\cdot\mathbf{e}_2 \\
c_{13} &= \mathbf{n}_1\cdot\mathbf{e}_3 \\
c_{21} &= \mathbf{n}_2\cdot\mathbf{e}_1 \\
c_{22} &= \mathbf{n}_2\cdot\mathbf{e}_2 \\
c_{23} &= \mathbf{n}_2\cdot\mathbf{e}_3 \\
c_{31} &= \mathbf{n}_3\cdot\mathbf{e}_1 \\
c_{32} &= \mathbf{n}_3\cdot\mathbf{e}_2 \\
c_{33} &= \mathbf{n}_3\cdot\mathbf{e}_3
\end{align}$$

By referring collectively to e_{1}, e_{2}, e_{3} as the e basis and to n_{1}, n_{2}, n_{3} as the n basis, the matrix containing all the c_{jk} is known as the "transformation matrix from e to n", or the "rotation matrix from e to n" (because it can be imagined as the "rotation" of a vector from one basis to another), or the "direction cosine matrix from e to n" (because it contains direction cosines). The properties of a rotation matrix are such that its inverse is equal to its transpose. This means that the "rotation matrix from e to n" is the transpose of "rotation matrix from n to e".

The properties of a direction cosine matrix, C are:

- the determinant is unity, |C| = 1;
- the inverse is equal to the transpose;
- the rows and columns are orthogonal unit vectors, therefore their dot products are zero.

The advantage of this method is that a direction cosine matrix can usually be obtained independently by using Euler angles or a quaternion to relate the two vector bases, so the basis conversions can be performed directly, without having to work out all the dot products described above.

By applying several matrix multiplications in succession, any vector can be expressed in any basis so long as the set of direction cosines is known relating the successive bases.

=== Other dimensions ===
With the exception of the cross and triple products, the above formulae generalise to two dimensions and higher dimensions. For example, addition generalises to two dimensions as
$$(a_1{\mathbf e}_1 + a_2{\mathbf e}_2)+(b_1{\mathbf e}_1 + b_2{\mathbf e}_2) = (a_1+b_1){\mathbf e}_1 + (a_2+b_2){\mathbf e}_2,$$
and in four dimensions as
$$\begin{align}
(a_1{\mathbf e}_1 + a_2{\mathbf e}_2 + a_3{\mathbf e}_3 + a_4{\mathbf e}_4) &+ (b_1{\mathbf e}_1 + b_2{\mathbf e}_2 + b_3{\mathbf e}_3 + b_4{\mathbf e}_4) =\\
(a_1+b_1){\mathbf e}_1 + (a_2+b_2){\mathbf e}_2 &+ (a_3+b_3){\mathbf e}_3 + (a_4+b_4){\mathbf e}_4.
\end{align}$$

The cross product does not readily generalise to other dimensions, though the closely related exterior product does, whose result is a bivector. In two dimensions this is simply a pseudoscalar
$$(a_1{\mathbf e}_1 + a_2{\mathbf e}_2)\wedge(b_1{\mathbf e}_1 + b_2{\mathbf e}_2) = (a_1 b_2 - a_2 b_1)\mathbf{e}_1 \mathbf{e}_2.$$

A seven-dimensional cross product is similar to the cross product in that its result is a vector orthogonal to the two arguments; there is however no natural way of selecting one of the possible such products.

== Physics ==
Vectors have many uses in physics and other sciences.

=== Length and units ===
In abstract vector spaces, the length of the arrow depends on a dimensionless scale. If it represents, for example, a force, the "scale" is of physical dimension length/force. Thus there is typically consistency in scale among quantities of the same dimension, but otherwise scale ratios may vary; for example, if "1 newton" and "5 m" are both represented with an arrow of 2 cm, the scales are 1 m:50 N and 1:250 respectively. Equal length of vectors of different dimension has no particular significance unless there is some proportionality constant inherent in the system that the diagram represents. Also length of a unit vector (of dimension length, not length/force, etc.) has no coordinate-system-invariant significance.

=== Vector-valued functions ===
Often in areas of physics and mathematics, a vector evolves in time, meaning that it depends on a time parameter t. For instance, if r represents the position vector of a particle, then r(t) gives a parametric representation of the trajectory of the particle. Vector-valued functions can be differentiated and integrated by differentiating or integrating the components of the vector, and many of the familiar rules from calculus continue to hold for the derivative and integral of vector-valued functions.

=== Position, velocity and acceleration ===
The position of a point x = (x_{1}, x_{2}, x_{3}) in three-dimensional space can be represented as a position vector whose base point is the origin
$${\mathbf x} = x_1 {\mathbf e}_1 + x_2{\mathbf e}_2 + x_3{\mathbf e}_3.$$
The position vector has dimensions of length.

Given two points x = (x_{1}, x_{2}, x_{3}), y = (y_{1}, y_{2}, y_{3}) their displacement is a vector
$${\mathbf y}-{\mathbf x}=(y_1-x_1){\mathbf e}_1 + (y_2-x_2){\mathbf e}_2 + (y_3-x_3){\mathbf e}_3.$$
which specifies the position of y relative to x. The length of this vector gives the straight-line distance from x to y. Displacement has the dimensions of length.

The velocity v of a point or particle is a vector, its length gives the speed. For constant velocity the position at time t will be
$${\mathbf x}_t= t {\mathbf v} + {\mathbf x}_0,$$
where x_{0} is the position at time t = 0. Velocity is the time derivative of position. Its dimensions are length/time.

Acceleration a of a point is vector which is the time derivative of velocity. Its dimensions are length/time^{2}.

=== Force, energy, work ===
Force is a vector with dimensions of mass×length/time^{2} (N m s ^{−2}) and Newton's second law is the scalar multiplication
$${\mathbf F} = m{\mathbf a}$$

Work is the dot product of force and displacement
$$W = {\mathbf F} \cdot ({\mathbf x}_2 - {\mathbf x}_1).$$

== Vectors, pseudovectors, and transformations ==
An alternative characterization of Euclidean vectors, especially in physics, describes them as lists of quantities which behave in a certain way under a coordinate transformation. A contravariant vector is required to have components that "transform opposite to the basis" under changes of basis. The vector itself does not change when the basis is transformed; instead, the components of the vector make a change that cancels the change in the basis. In other words, if the reference axes (and the basis derived from it) were rotated in one direction, the component representation of the vector would rotate in the opposite way to generate the same final vector. Similarly, if the reference axes were stretched in one direction, the components of the vector would reduce in an exactly compensating way. Mathematically, if the basis undergoes a transformation described by an invertible matrix M, so that a coordinate vector x is transformed to x′ = Mx, then a contravariant vector v must be similarly transformed via v′ = M$^{-1}$v. This important requirement is what distinguishes a contravariant vector from any other triple of physically meaningful quantities. For example, if v consists of the x, y, and z-components of velocity, then v is a contravariant vector: if the coordinates of space are stretched, rotated, or twisted, then the components of the velocity transform in the same way. On the other hand, for instance, a triple consisting of the length, width, and height of a rectangular box could make up the three components of an abstract vector, but this vector would not be contravariant, since rotating the box does not change the box's length, width, and height. Examples of contravariant vectors include displacement, velocity, electric field, momentum, force, and acceleration.

In the language of differential geometry, the requirement that the components of a vector transform according to the same matrix of the coordinate transition is equivalent to defining a contravariant vector to be a tensor of contravariant rank one. Alternatively, a contravariant vector is defined to be a tangent vector, and the rules for transforming a contravariant vector follow from the chain rule.

Some vectors transform like contravariant vectors, except that when they are reflected through a mirror, they flip and gain a minus sign. A transformation that switches right-handedness to left-handedness and vice versa like a mirror does is said to change the orientation of space. A vector which gains a minus sign when the orientation of space changes is called a pseudovector or an axial vector. Ordinary vectors are sometimes called true vectors or polar vectors to distinguish them from pseudovectors. Pseudovectors occur most frequently as the cross product of two ordinary vectors.

One example of a pseudovector is angular velocity. Driving in a car, and looking forward, each of the wheels has an angular velocity vector pointing to the left. If the world is reflected in a mirror which switches the left and right side of the car, the reflection of this angular velocity vector points to the right, but the actual angular velocity vector of the wheel still points to the left, corresponding to the minus sign. Other examples of pseudovectors include magnetic field, torque, or more generally any cross product of two (true) vectors.

This distinction between vectors and pseudovectors is often ignored, but it becomes important in studying symmetry properties.

== See also ==
- Affine space, which distinguishes between vectors and points
- Banach space
- Clifford algebra
- Complex number
- Coordinate system
- Covariance and contravariance of vectors
- Four-vector, a non-Euclidean vector in Minkowski space (i.e. four-dimensional spacetime), important in relativity
- Function space
- Grassmann's Ausdehnungslehre
- Hilbert space
- Normal vector
- Null vector
- Parity (physics)
- Position (geometry)
- Pseudovector
- Quaternion
- Tangential and normal components (of a vector)
- Tensor
- Unit vector
- Vector bundle
- Vector calculus
- Vector notation
- Vector-valued function
