= Giusto Bellavitis =

Italian mathematician, senator and municipal councilor (1803–1880)

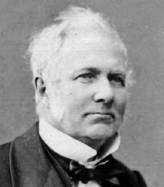
- Born: 22 November 1803; Bassano, Vicenza
- Died: 6 November 1880 (aged 76); Tezze sul Brenta (near Bassano)
- Education: University of Padua
- Known for: Equipollence
- Spouse: Maria Tavelli
- Scientific career
- Fields: Geometry
- Workplaces: University of Padua

Giusto Bellavitis (22 November 1803 – 6 November 1880) was an Italian mathematician, senator, and municipal councilor. According to Charles Laisant,

His principle achievement, which marks his place, in the future and the present, among the names of geometers that will endure, is the invention of the method of equipollences, a new method of analytic geometry that is both philosophical and fruitful.

Born in Bassano del Grappa in 1803 to Ernesto Bellavitis and Giovanna Navarini, Giusto studied largely alone. In 1840, he entered Institut Venitian and in 1842 began instructing at Lycee de Vicence. He became professor of descriptive geometry at University of Padua in 1845. With the unification of Italy he took the opportunity to revise the curriculum to include complementary algebra and analytic geometry. Bellavitis married in 1842 and had one son who also taught geometry at the University of Padua.

Bellavitis anticipated the idea of a Euclidean vector with his notion of equipollence. Two line segments AB and CD are equipollent if they are parallel and have the same length and direction. The relation is denoted $AB \bumpeq CD .$ In modern terminology, this relation between line segments is an example of an equivalence relation. The concept of vector addition was written by Bellavitis as:$AB + BC \bumpeq AC .$ According to Laissant, Bellavitis published works in "arithmetic, algebra, geometry, infinitesimal calculus, probability, mechanics, physics, astronomy, chemistry, mineralogy, geodesy, geography, telegraphy, social science, philosophy, and literature."

== Works ==
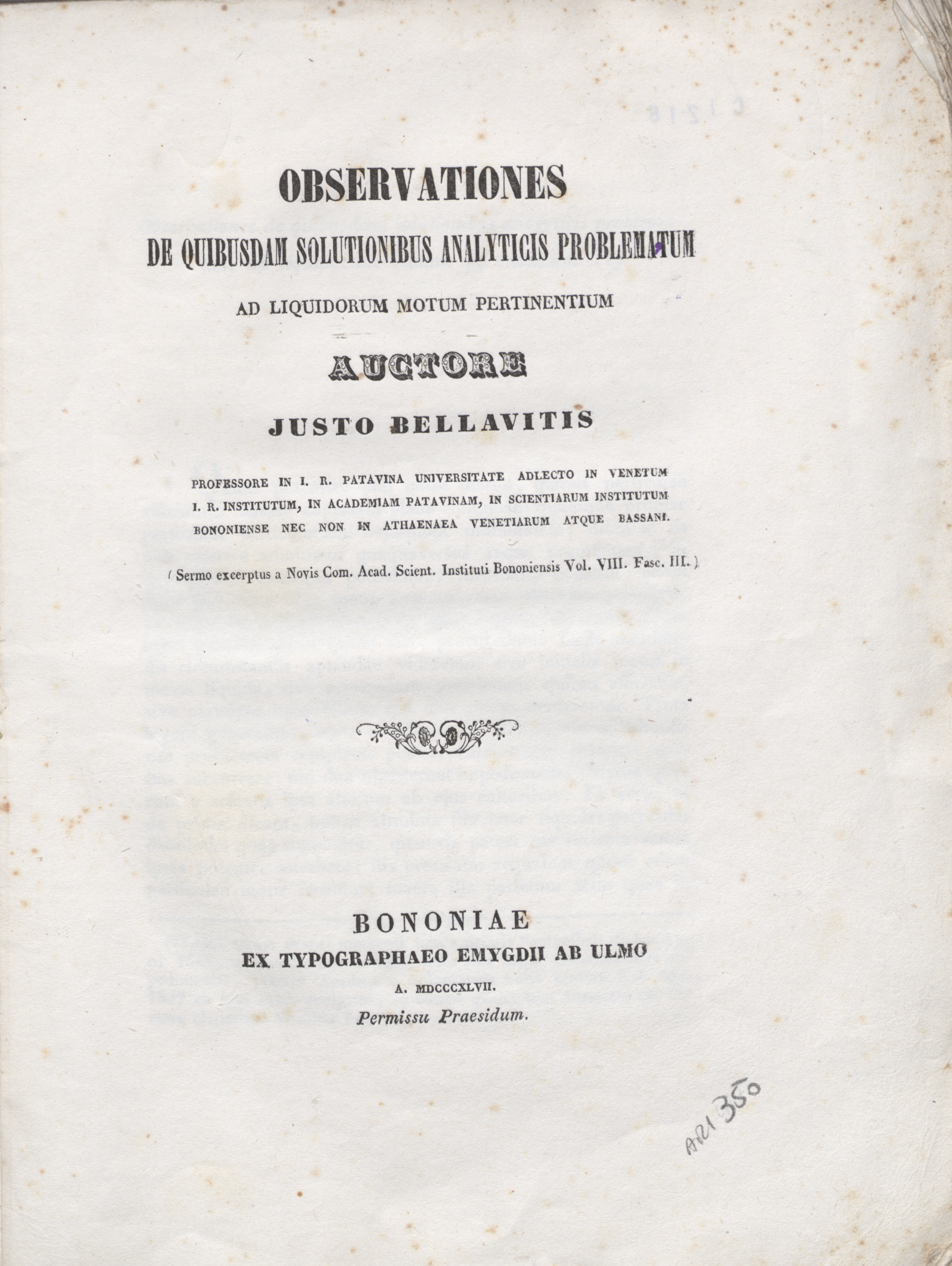
Observationes de quibusdam solutionibus analyticis (1847)

- 1847: Observationes de quibusdam solutionibus analyticis problematum ad liquidorum motum pertinentium. Bononiae: ex typographaeo Emygdii ab Ulmo. via Biblioteca europea di informazione e cultura
- 1852: Saggio sull'algebra degli immaginari, link from HathiTrust
- 1854: Sposizione del Metodo della Equipollenze, link from Google Books.
- 1858: Calcolo dei Quaternioni di W.R. Hamilton e sua Relazione col Metodo delle Equipollenze, link from HathiTrust.
- 1868: Lezioni di Geometria Descrittiva, 2nd edition, link from HathiTrust

== Awards ==
- Fellow of the Istituto Veneto di Scienze, Lettere ed Arti in 1840
- Fellow of the Società Italiana dei Quaranta in 1850
- Member of the Accademia dei Lincei in 1879
