= Equipollence (geometry) =

Property of segments that have the same length and the same direction

In Euclidean geometry, equipollence is a homogeneous relation between directed line segments. Two segments are said to be equipollent when they have the same length and direction. Two equipollent segments are parallel but not necessarily colinear nor overlapping. For example, a segment AB, from point A to point B, has the opposite direction to segment BA; thus AB and BA are not equipollent.

== Parallelogram property ==
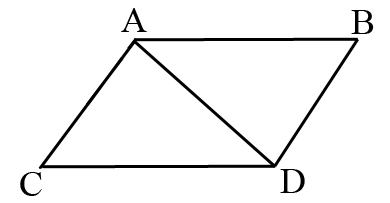
If the segments AB and CD are equipollent, then AC and BD are also equipollent

A property of Euclidean spaces is the parallelogram property of vectors: If two segments are equipollent, then they form two sides of a (possibly degenerate) parallelogram:

If a given vector holds between a and b, c and d, then the vector which holds between a and c is the same as that which holds between b and d.

— Bertrand Russell, The Principles of Mathematics, page 432

== History ==
Symbol for equipollence

The concept of equipollent line segments was advanced by Giusto Bellavitis in 1835. Subsequently, the term vector was adopted for a class of equipollent line segments. Bellavitis's use of the idea of a relation to compare different but similar objects has become a common mathematical technique, particularly in the use of equivalence relations. Bellavitis used a special notation for the equipollence of segments AB and CD:

$$AB  \bumpeq CD .$$

The following passages, translated by Michael J. Crowe, show the anticipation that Bellavitis had of vector concepts:

Equipollences continue to hold when one substitutes for the lines in them, other lines which are respectively equipollent to them, however they may be situated in space. From this it can be understood how any number and any kind of lines may be summed, and that in whatever order these lines are taken, the same equipollent-sum will be obtained...

In equipollences, just as in equations, a line may be transferred from one side to the other, provided that the sign is changed...

Thus oppositely directed segments are negatives of each other: $AB + BA \bumpeq 0 .$

The equipollence $AB \bumpeq n.CD ,$ where n stands for a positive number, indicates that AB is both parallel to and has the same direction as CD, and that their lengths have the relation expressed by AB = n.CD.

The segment from A to B is a bound vector, while the class of segments equipollent to it is a free vector, in the parlance of Euclidean vectors.

Equipollent segments were called steps by W. K. Clifford in 1878: "the lines aa' and bb' will represent the same step of a rigid body if they are equal in length and in the same direction; that is, not merely parallel, but drawn in the same sense on two parallel straight lines. Thus a step of a rigid body is adequately represented by a line of given length and given direction drawn anywhere."

== Spherical geometry ==
Geometric equipollence is also used on the sphere:

To appreciate Hamilton's method, let us first recall the much simpler case of the Abelian group of translations in Euclidean three-dimensional space. Each translation is representable as a vector in space, only the direction and magnitude being significant, and the location irrelevant. The composition of two translations is given by the head-to-tail parallelogram rule of vector addition; and taking the inverse amounts to reversing direction. In Hamilton's theory of turns, we have a generalization of such a picture from the Abelian translation group to the non-Abelian SU(2). Instead of vectors in space, we deal with directed great circle arcs, of length < π on a unit sphere S^{2} in a Euclidean three-dimensional space. Two such arcs are deemed equivalent if by sliding one along its great circle it can be made to coincide with the other.

On a great circle of a sphere, two directed circular arcs are equipollent when they agree in direction and arc length. An equivalence class of such arcs is associated with a quaternion versor

$\exp(a r) = \cos a + r \sin a ,$ where a is arc length and r determines the plane of the great circle by perpendicularity.

== Abstraction ==
Properties of the equivalence classes of equipollent segments can be abstracted to define affine space:

If A is a set of points and V is a vector space, then (A, V) is an affine space provided that for any two points a,b in A there is a vector $\overrightarrow {a b}$ in V, and for any a in A and v in V there is b in A such that $\overrightarrow {a b} = v ,$ and for any three points in A there is the vector equation

$$\overrightarrow {a b} + \overrightarrow {b c} = \overrightarrow {a c} .$$

Evidently this development depends on previous introduction to abstract vector spaces, in contrast to the introduction of vectors via equivalence classes of directed segments.
