= National Standards of the Republic of China =

The National Standards of the Republic of China (CNS) (Chinese: 中華民國國家標準; Pe̍h-ōe-jī: Tiong-hôa Bîn-kok Kok-ka Piau-chún) are the national standards of Taiwan, officially the Republic of China (ROC). These standards were established in 1946, and administered by the Bureau of Standards, Metrology and Inspection ("BSMI") of the Ministry of Economic Affairs of Taiwan. These standards are divided into 26 numbered categories. Applying the National Standards is voluntary unless authorities in charge cite any parts of the standards as laws and regulations. By the end of 2003, more than 15000 national standards have been issued. Although the Republic of China was removed in 1950 from the International Organization for Standardization (ISO) for failure to pay membership dues accordingly, there are still many National Standards translated from ISO standards into Chinese. A few standards also have English versions, but in case of any divergence of interpretation, the Chinese text shall prevail.

== Selected Sections ==
Each standard has a general number and may be prefixed with "CNS", such as CNS 11296. The general numbers, English names and any similar ISO standards of some standards are listed below:

| General number | English name | Similar ISO or IEC standard |
|---|---|---|
| 5 | Trimmed Sizes of Writing and Printing Paper | ISO 216 |
| 5205 | Information Technology-7 Bit Coded Character Set for Information Interchange | ISO/IEC 646 |
| 7648 | Data Elements and Interchange Formats—Information Interchange—Representation of Dates and Times | ISO 8601 |
| 7654 | Information technology—Character code structure and extension techniques | ISO/IEC 2022 |
| 7656 | Information processing—ISO 8-bit code for information interchange - Structure and rules for implementation | ISO/IEC 4873 |
| 8381 | Information Interchange—Representation of Human Sexes | ISO 5218 |
| 9618 | Diving Hoses | |
| 10987 | The International System of Units (SI) | ISO 1000 |
| 11251 | Diving Wet Suit | |
| 11296 | General Principles Concerning Quantities, Units and Symbols | ISO 31 |
| 11643 | Chinese Standard Interchange Code (for Generally Used Chinese Characters) | |
| 12497 | Diving Mask | |
| 12498 | Method of Test for Diving Mask | |
| 12680 | Quality management systems - Fundamentals and vocabulary | ISO 9000 |
| 12842 | Codes for the Representation of Names of Countries | ISO 3166 |
| 12864 | Documentation - International Standard Book Numbering (ISBN) | ISO 2108 |
| 12873 | Codes for the Representation of Currencies and Funds | ISO 4217 |
| 13188 | Code for the Representation of Names of Languages | ISO 639 |
| 13246 | Information technology—8-bit single-byte coded graphic character sets - Part 1: Latin alphabet No. 1 | ISO/IEC 8859-1 |
| 13247 | Information technology—8-bit single-byte coded graphic character sets - Part 2: Latin alphabet No. 2 | ISO/IEC 8859-2 |
| 13325 | Information technology—8-bit single-byte coded graphic character sets - Part 3: Latin alphabet No. 3 | ISO/IEC 8859-3 |
| 13326 | Information technology—8-bit single-byte coded graphic character sets - Part 4: Latin alphabet No. 4 | ISO/IEC 8859-4 |
| 13327 | Information technology—8-bit single-byte coded graphic character sets - Part 5: Latin / Cyrillic alphabet | ISO/IEC 8859-5 |
| 13328 | Information technology—8-bit single-byte coded graphic character sets - Part 9: Latin alphabet No. 5 | ISO/IEC 8859-9 |
| 13384 | Information technology—8-bit single-byte coded graphic character sets - Part 6: Latin / Arabic alphabet | ISO/IEC 8859-6 |
| 13385 | Information technology—8-bit single-byte coded graphic character sets - Part 7: Latin / Greek alphabet | ISO/IEC 8859-7 |
| 13386 | Information technology—8-bit single-byte coded graphic character sets - Part 8: Latin / Hebrew alphabet | ISO/IEC 8859-8 |
| 13524 | Standard Representation of Latitude, Longitude and Altitude for Geographic Point Locations | ISO 6709 |
| 13611 | Bibliographic References: Content, Form and Structure | ISO 690 |
| 14001 | Environmental Management Systems—Specification with Guidance for Use | ISO 14001 |
| 14336 | Safety of information technology equipment | IEC 60950 |
| 14614 | Eye and face protection for sports use − Part 3: Requirements and test methods for eyewear intended to be used for surface swimming | |
| 14649 | Information Technology—Universal Multiple-Octet Coded Character Set (UCS) | ISO/IEC 10646 |

== See also ==
- Taiwan Accreditation Foundation
