= Decimal separator =

Numerical symbol

Both a comma and a full stop (or period) are generally accepted decimal separators for international use. The apostrophe and Arabic decimal separator are also used in certain contexts.

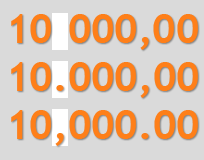
Three ways to group the number ten thousand with digit group separators: Space, the internationally recommended thousands separator.; Full stop (or period), the thousands separator used in many non-English speaking countries.; Comma, the thousands separator used in most English-speaking countries.

A decimal separator is a symbol that separates the integer part from the fractional part of a number written in decimal form. Different countries officially designate different symbols for use as the separator. The choice of symbol can also affect the choice of symbol for the thousands separator used in digit grouping.

Any such symbol can be called a decimal mark, decimal marker, or decimal sign. Symbol-specific names are also used; decimal point and decimal comma refer to a dot (either at the baseline or the vertically middle of the written characters) and comma, respectively, when it is used as a decimal separator; these are the usual terms used in English, with the aforementioned generic terms reserved for abstract usage.

In many contexts, when a number is spoken, the function of the separator is assumed by the spoken name of the symbol: comma or point in most cases. In some specialized contexts, the word decimal is instead used for this purpose (such as in International Civil Aviation Organization-regulated air traffic control communications). In mathematics, the decimal separator is a type of radix point, a term that also applies to number systems with bases other than ten.

== Current international standards ==
The 22nd General Conference on Weights and Measures declared in 2003, "The symbol for the decimal marker shall be either the point on the line or the comma on the line." It further reaffirmed,

Numbers may be divided in groups of three in order to facilitate reading; neither dots nor commas are ever inserted in the spaces between groups

That is, "1 000 000 000" is preferred over "1,000,000,000" or "1.000.000.000". This use has therefore been recommended by technical organizations, such as the United States's National Institute of Standards and Technology.

ISO 80000-1 stipulates, "The decimal sign is either a comma or a point on the line." The standard does not stipulate any preference, observing that usage will depend on customary usage in the language concerned, but adds a note that as per ISO/IEC directives, all ISO standards should use the comma as the decimal marker.

== History ==
=== Hellenistic–Renaissance eras ===
In the Middle Ages, before printing, a bar ( ¯ ) over the units digit was used to separate the integral part of a number from its fractional part, as in 99̅95 (meaning 99.95 in decimal point format). A similar notation remains in common use as an underbar to superscript digits, especially for monetary values without a decimal separator, as in 99^{95}. Later, a "separatrix" (i.e., a short, roughly vertical ink stroke) between the units and tenths position became the norm among Arab mathematicians (e.g. 99ˌ95), while an L-shaped or vertical bar (|) served as the separatrix in England. When this character was typeset, it was convenient to use the existing comma (99,95) or full stop (99.95) instead.

Positional decimal fractions appear for the first time in a book by the Arab mathematician Abu'l-Hasan al-Uqlidisi written in the 10th century. He used a short vertical bar above the digit. The practice is ultimately derived from the decimal Hindu–Arabic numeral system used in Indian mathematics, and popularized by the Persian mathematician Al-Khwarizmi, when Latin translation of his work on the Indian numerals introduced the decimal positional number system to the Western world. His Compendious Book on Calculation by Completion and Balancing presented the first systematic solution of linear and quadratic equations in Arabic.

Gerbert of Aurillac marked triples of columns with an arc (called a "Pythagorean arc"), when using his Hindu–Arabic numeral-based abacus in the 10th century. Fibonacci followed this convention when writing numbers, such as in his influential work Liber Abaci in the 13th century.

The earliest known record of using the decimal point is in the astronomical tables compiled by the Italian merchant and mathematician Giovanni Bianchini in the 1440s.

Tables of logarithms prepared by John Napier in 1614 and 1619 used the period (full stop) as the decimal separator, which was then adopted by Henry Briggs in his influential 17th century work. When presenting in 1617 calculations with his Napier bones in “Rabdologiæ” however, Napier explains that a notation like 1993,273 (with a comma) is more effective than $1993\,\tfrac{118}{432}$.

In France, the full stop was already in use in printing to make Roman numerals more readable, so the comma was chosen.

Many other countries, such as Italy, also chose to use the comma to mark the decimal units position. It has been made standard by the ISO for international blueprints. However, English-speaking countries took the comma to separate sequences of three digits. In some countries, a raised dot or dash (upper comma) may be used for grouping or decimal separator; this is particularly common in handwriting.

=== English-speaking countries ===
In the United States, the full stop or period (.) is used as the standard decimal separator.

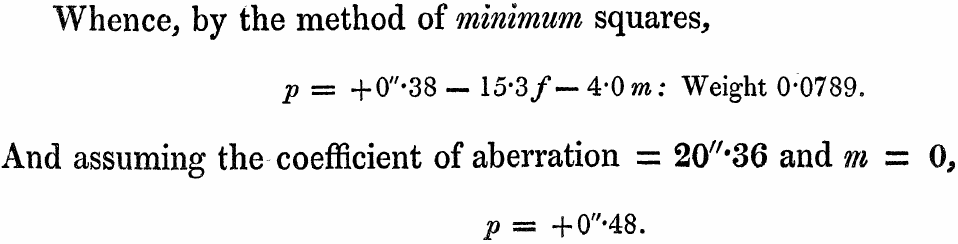
The interpunct (·) used as a decimal separator in a British print from 1839

In the nations of the British Empire (and, later, the Commonwealth of Nations), the full stop could be used in typewritten material and its use was not banned, although the interpunct (a.k.a. decimal point, point or mid dot) was preferred as a decimal separator, in printing technologies that could accommodate it, e.g. 99·95 . However, as the mid dot was already in common use in the mathematics world to indicate multiplication, the SI rejected its use as the decimal separator.

During the beginning of British metrication in the late 1960s and with impending currency decimalisation, there was some debate in the United Kingdom as to whether the decimal comma or decimal point should be preferred: the British Standards Institution and some sectors of industry advocated the comma and the Decimal Currency Board advocated for the point. In the event, the point was chosen by the Ministry of Technology in 1968.

California milepost marker at mile 144.44

When South Africa adopted the metric system, it adopted the comma as its decimal separator, although a number of house styles, including some English-language newspapers such as The Sunday Times, continue to use the full stop.

Previously, signs along California roads expressed distances in decimal numbers with the decimal part in superscript, as in 3^{7}, meaning 3.7. Though California has since transitioned to mixed numbers with common fractions, the older style remains on postmile markers and bridge inventory markers.

=== Constructed languages ===
The three most spoken international auxiliary languages, Ido, Esperanto, and Interlingua, all use the comma as the decimal separator.

Interlingua has used the comma as its decimal separator since the publication of the Interlingua Grammar in 1951.

Esperanto also uses the comma as its official decimal separator, whilst thousands are usually separated by non-breaking spaces (e.g. 12 345 678,9). It is possible to separate thousands by a full stop (e.g. 12.345.678,9), though this is not as common.

Ido's Kompleta Gramatiko Detaloza di la Linguo Internaciona Ido (Complete Detailed Grammar of the International Language Ido) officially states that commas are used for the decimal separator whilst full stops are used to separate thousands, millions, etc. So the number 12,345,678.90123 (in American notation), for instance, would be written 12.345.678,90123 in Ido.

The 1931 grammar of Volapük uses the comma as its decimal separator but, somewhat unusually, the middle dot as its thousands separator (12·345·678,90123).

In 1958, disputes between European and American delegates over the correct representation of the decimal separator nearly stalled the development of the ALGOL computer programming language. ALGOL ended up allowing different decimal separators, but most computer languages and standard data formats (e.g., C, Java, Fortran, Cascading Style Sheets (CSS)) specify a dot.

The underscore is a permitted separator in most programming languages that allow digit grouping, such as Ada, D, Rust, Python, and Ruby. C++, however, uses the apostrophe ('). Digit separators are ignored by the computer and can be used flexibly. For example, a programmer could write 1_00_00_000 to match the Indian numbering system's format for ten million, 1,00,00,000.)

=== Radix point ===
In mathematics and computing, a radix point, or radix character, is a symbol used in the display of numbers to separate the integer part of the value from its fractional part. In English and many other languages (including many that are written right-to-left), the integer part is at the left of the radix point, and the fraction part at the right of it.

A radix point is most often used in decimal (base 10) notation, when it is more commonly called the decimal point (with deci- indicating base 10). In English-speaking countries, the decimal point is usually a small dot (.) placed either on the baseline, or halfway between the baseline and the top of the digits (·) In many other countries, the radix point is a comma (,) placed on the baseline.

These conventions are generally used both in machine displays (printing, computer monitors) and in handwriting. It is important to know which notation is being used when working in different software programs. The respective ISO 31-0 standard defines both the comma and the small dot as decimal markers, but does not explicitly define universal radix marks for bases other than 10.

Fractional numbers are rarely displayed in other number bases, but, when they are, a radix character may be used for the same purpose. When used with the binary (base 2) representation, it may be called "binary point".

== Digit grouping ==
For ease of reading, numbers with many digits (e.g. numbers over 999) may be divided into groups using a delimiter, such as comma (,), dot (.), Narrow No-Break Space (" "), space (" "), underscore (_) in programming languages, or apostrophe (') in Switzerland. In some countries, these "digit group separators" are only employed to the left of the decimal separator; in others, they are also used to separate numbers with a long fractional part. An important reason for grouping is that it allows rapid judgement of the number of digits, via telling at a glance ("subitizing") rather than counting (contrast, for example, 100 000 000 with 100000000 for one hundred million).

The use of thin spaces as separators instead of dots or commas (for example: 20 000 and 1 000 000 for "twenty thousand" and "one million"), has been official policy of the International Bureau of Weights and Measures (BIPM) since 1948 (and reaffirmed in 2003), as well as of the International Union of Pure and Applied Chemistry (IUPAC), the American Medical Association's widely followed AMA Manual of Style, and the UK Metrication Board, among others.

According to the BIPM neither dots or commas are allowed to be used for grouping and when there are only four digits, grouping is regarded as superfluous.

The correct Unicode delimiter is Narrow No-Break Space " " (U+202F) which is thinner than a normal space and prevents the number from being broken up at the end of a line.

The groups created by the delimiters tend to follow the usages of local languages, which vary. In European languages, large numbers are read in groups of thousands, and the delimiter (occurring every three digits when used) may be called a "thousands separator". In East Asian cultures, particularly China, Japan, and Korea, large numbers are read in groups of myriads (10 000s), but the delimiter often separates the digits into groups of three.

The Indian numbering system is more complex: It groups the rightmost three digits together (until the hundreds place) and then groups digits in sets of two. For example, one trillion would be written "10,00,00,00,00,000" or "10 kharab".

The convention for digit group separators historically varied among countries, but usually sought to distinguish the delimiter from the decimal separator. Traditionally, English-speaking countries (except South Africa) employed commas as the delimiter—10,000—and other European countries employed periods (full stops) or spaces: 10.000 or 10 000. Because of the confusion that could result in international documents, in recent years, the use of spaces as separators has been advocated by the superseded SI/ISO 31-0 standard, as well as by the BIPM and IUPAC. These groups have also begun advocating the use of a "thin space" in "groups of three".

Within the United States, the American Medical Association's widely followed AMA Manual of Style also calls for a thin space. In programming languages and online encoding environments (for example, ASCII-only languages and environments) a thin space is not practical or available. Often, either underscores and regular word spaces, or no delimiters at all are used instead.

=== Data vis-à-vis mask ===
Digit group separators can occur either as part of the data or as a mask through which the data is displayed. This is an example of the separation of presentation and content, making it possible to display numbers in spaced groups while not inserting any whitespace characters into the string of digits that make up those numbers. In many computing contexts, it is preferred to omit the digit group separators from the data and instead overlay them as a mask (an input mask or an output mask).

Common examples include spreadsheets and databases, in which currency values are entered without such marks but are displayed with them inserted. Similarly, phone numbers can have hyphens, spaces or parentheses as a mask rather than as data. In web content, digit grouping can be done with CSS. This is useful because the number can be copied and pasted elsewhere (such as into a calculator) and parsed by the computer as-is (i.e., without the user manually purging the extraneous characters). For example:

- 149597870700 metres is 1 astronomical unit.
- 3.14159265358979323846 is π rounded to 20 decimal places.
- 2.71828182845904523536 is e rounded to 20 decimal places.

In many programming languages, it is possible to group the digits in the program's source code to make it easier to read.

Ada, Free-form Fortran 90, Perl, D, OCaml, Ruby, Java, Rust, Julia, Python (since version 3.6), Kotlin, C# (since version 7.0), Swift, Haskell (from GHC version 8.6.1), Go (since version 1.13), PHP (since version 7.4), Zig,, JavaScript (since ES2021) and Scala (since version 2.13) have adopted the underscore (_) character for this purpose. As such, these languages would allow the number seven hundred million to be entered as "700_000_000". On the other hand, fixed-form Fortran ignores whitespace in all contexts, so "700 000 000" would be allowed. In C++14, Rebol and Red, the use of an apostrophe for digit grouping is allowed. Thus, "700'000'000" would be allowed in those languages.

The code shown below, written in Kotlin, illustrates the use of separators to increase readability:

val exampleNumber = 12_000_000 // twelve million

=== Exceptions to digit grouping ===
The International Bureau of Weights and Measures states that "when there are only four digits before or after the decimal marker, it is customary not to use a space to isolate a single digit." Likewise, some manuals of style state that thousands separators should not be used in normal text for numbers from 1000 to 9999 where no decimal fractional part is shown (or, in other words, for four-digit whole numbers), whereas others use thousands separators and others use both. For example, APA style stipulates a thousands separator for "most figures of 1000 or more" except for page numbers, binary digits, temperatures, etc.

There are always "common-sense" country-specific exceptions to digit grouping, such as year numbers, postal codes, and ID numbers of predefined nongrouped format, which style guides usually point out.

=== In non-base-10 numbering systems ===
In binary (base-2), a full space can be used between groups of four digits, corresponding to a nibble, or equivalently to a hexadecimal digit. For integer numbers, dots are used as well to separate groups of four bits. (Note: As an example, the DR-DOS DEBUG H command (short for 'hex') displays the entered hexadecimal number in hexadecimal, followed by the same number in decimal, octal, and binary, prefixed with a hash sign (#), backslash (\), and percent sign (%) respectively: -h 1234 1234 #4660 \011064 %0001.0010.0011.0100) Alternatively, binary digits may be grouped by threes, corresponding to an octal digit. Similarly, in hexadecimal (base-16), full spaces are usually used to group digits into twos, making each group correspond to a byte. (Note: As an example, the DR-DOS DEBUG D command (short for 'dump') dumps the memory byte-wise in hexadecimal notation, with bytes separated by spaces and groups of eight bytes separated by hyphens: -d 0 1234:0000  57 69 6B 69 70 65 64 69-61 20 68 65 6C 70 73 21   Wikipedia helps!) Additionally, groups of eight bytes are often separated by a hyphen.

== Influence of calculators and computers ==
In countries with a decimal comma, the decimal point is also common as the "international" notation because of the influence of devices, such as electronic calculators, which use the decimal point. Most computer operating systems allow selection of the decimal separator; programs that have been carefully internationalized will follow this, but some programs ignore it and a few may even fail to operate if the setting has been changed.

In COBOL, the DECIMAL-POINT IS COMMA (Note: In November 2026 CPT-6 Luna found references that the clause 'DECIMAL-POINT IS COMMA' was part of COBOL’s standardized feature set by the ANSI COBOL-68 standard (X3.23-1968). COBOL had earlier versions, including COBOL-60 and COBOL-61 that may have included the clause.) clause in the SPECIAL-NAMES paragraph switches the decimal separator from a period to a comma for numeric displays, aligning with European number formats like 1.234,56.

Computer interfaces may be set to the Unicode international "Common locale" using LC_NUMERIC=C as defined at "Unicode CLDR project". Unicode Consortium. Details of the current (2020) definitions may be found at "01102-POSIX15897". Unicode Consortium.

== Conventions worldwide ==
Decimal separators: Dot (.) Comma (,) Both (may vary by location or other factors) Arabic decimal separator (٫) Data unavailable

=== Hindu–Arabic numerals ===
==== Countries using decimal comma ====
Countries where a comma (,) is used as a decimal separator include:

- Albania
- Algeria
- Andorra
- Angola
- Argentina
- Armenia
- Austria
- Azerbaijan
- Belarus
- Belgium
- Bolivia
- Bosnia and Herzegovina
- Brazil
- Bulgaria (Note: The national literary convention in Bulgaria and Mongolia is to use the comma as a decimal separator, but many places use the dot instead due to the prevalence of imported technology that internally uses the dot as the decimal separator. This is because the technology usually utilizes the decimal separator conventions of the country it was made in, and most of the technology is made in the United States, countries following the conventions and standards (such as ASCII) of the United States, or China – all of which use the dot as a decimal separator. Thus, in Bulgaria, the comma is the conventional decimal separator, but both the comma and the dot are used in practice. This is true for Mongolia as well, but the dot is more commonly used instead.)
- Cabo Verde
- Cameroon
- Canada (when using French)
- Chile
- Colombia
- Costa Rica
- Croatia
- Cuba
- Cyprus
- Czechia
- Denmark
- East Timor
- Ecuador
- Estonia
- Faroes
- Finland
- France
- Germany
- Georgia
- Greece
- Greenland
- Hungary
- Iceland
- Indonesia
- Italy
- Kazakhstan
- Kyrgyzstan
- Laos
- Latvia
- Lebanon
- Liechtenstein (Note: Switzerland and Liechtenstein officially use the comma. Point is used in IT and sometimes with currency values.)
- Lithuania
- Luxembourg
- Macau (in Portuguese text)
- Mauritania
- Moldova
- Mongolia
- Montenegro
- Morocco
- Mozambique
- Namibia (uses both marks)
- The Netherlands
- North Macedonia
- Norway
- Paraguay
- Peru
- Poland
- Portugal
- Romania
- Russia
- San Marino
- Serbia
- Slovakia
- Slovenia
- Somalia
- South Africa
- Spain (Note: According to several software developers, Spain and Sweden both use a comma as a decimal separator while Thailand uses a dot instead.)
- Suriname
- Sweden
- Switzerland
- Tunisia
- Turkey
- Turkmenistan
- Ukraine
- Uruguay
- Uzbekistan
- Venezuela
- Vietnam
- Zimbabwe

==== Countries using decimal point ====
Countries where a dot (.) is used as a decimal separator include:

- Australia
- Bahamas, The
- Bangladesh
- Botswana
- British West Indies
- Cambodia
- Canada (when using English)
- China
- Cyprus (currency numbers)
- Dominican Republic
- Egypt
- El Salvador
- Ethiopia
- Ghana
- Guatemala
- Guyana
- Honduras
- Hong Kong
- India
- Ireland
- Israel
- Jamaica
- Japan
- Jordan
- Kenya
- Korea, North
- Korea, South
- Libya
- Macau (in Chinese and English text)
- Malaysia
- Maldives
- Malta
- Mexico
- Myanmar
- Namibia (uses both marks)
- Nepal
- New Zealand
- Nicaragua
- Nigeria
- Pakistan
- Panama
- Peru (currency numbers)
- Philippines
- Rwanda
- Qatar
- Saudi Arabia
- Singapore
- Somalia
- Sri Lanka
- Syria
- Taiwan
- Tanzania
- Thailand
- Uganda
- United Arab Emirates
- United Kingdom
- United States (including insular areas)

=== Other numeral systems ===
Unicode defines a decimal separator key symbol (⎖ in hex U+2396, decimal 9110) which looks similar to the apostrophe. This symbol is from ISO/IEC 9995 and is intended for use on a keyboard to indicate a key that performs decimal separation.

In the Arab world, where Eastern Arabic numerals are used for writing numbers, a different character is used to separate the integer and fractional parts of numbers. It is referred to as an Arabic decimal separator (U+066B, rendered: ٫) in Unicode. An Arabic thousands separator (U+066C, rendered: ٬) also exists. Example: ۹٬۹۹۹٫۹۹ (9,999.99)

In Persian, the decimal separator is called momayyez. The Unicode Consortium's investigation concluded that "computer programs should render U+066B as a shortened, lowered, and possibly more slanted slash (٫); this should be distinguishable from the slash at the first sight." To separate sequences of three digits, an Arabic thousands separator (rendered as: ٬), a Latin comma, or a blank space may be used; however this is not a standard. Example: ۹٬۹۹۹٫۹۹ (9,999.99)

In English Braille, the decimal point, ⠨, is distinct from both the comma, ⠂, and the full stop, ⠲.

== Examples of use ==
The following examples show the decimal separator and the thousands separator in various countries that use the Arabic numeral system.

Style	Countries and regions
1,234,567.89	Australia, Cambodia, Canada (English-speaking; unofficial), China, Cyprus (currency numbers), Hong Kong, Iran, Ireland, Israel, Japan, Korea, Macau (in Chinese and English text), Malaysia, Mexico, Namibia, New Zealand, Pakistan, Peru (currency numbers), Philippines, Singapore, South Africa (English-speaking; unofficial), Taiwan, Thailand, United Kingdom and other Commonwealth states except Mozambique, United States.
1234567.89	Canada (English-speaking; official), China, Estonia (currency numbers), Hong Kong (in education), Mexico, Namibia, South Africa (English-speaking; unofficial), Sri Lanka, Switzerland (in federal texts for currency numbers only), United Kingdom (in education), United States (in education). SI-style (English version), not including currency.
1234567,89	Albania, Belgium, Brazil, Bulgaria, Canada (French-speaking), Costa Rica, Croatia, Czech Republic, Estonia, Finland, France, Germany, Hungary, Italy (in education), Latin America, Latin Europe, Latvia, Lithuania, Macau (in Portuguese text), Mozambique, Norway, Peru, Poland, Portugal, Russia, Serbia (informal), Slovakia, Slovenia, South Africa (official), Spain (official use since 2010, according to the RAE and CSIC), Sweden, Switzerland (in federal texts, except currency numbers), Ukraine, Vietnam (in education). SI-style (French version), not including currency.
1.234.567,89	Austria, Bosnia and Herzegovina, Brazil (informal and in technology), Chile, Colombia, Croatia (in bookkeeping and technology), Denmark, Germany, Greece, Indonesia, Italy, Latin America (informal), Netherlands, Romania, Slovenia, Serbia, Spain (used until 2010, inadvisable use according to the RAE and CSIC), (Note: "Al escribir números de más de cuatro cifras, se agruparán estas de tres en tres, empezando por la derecha, y separando los grupos por espacios en blanco. [...] Nunca se escriben con puntos, comas ni blancos de separación los números referidos a años, páginas, versos, portales de vías urbanas, códigos postales, apartados de correos, números de artículos legales, decretos o leyes." ("When writing numbers more than four figures, these will be grouped into threes, starting from the right, and separating the groups by whitespaces. [...] Numbers that refer to years, pages, verses, urban roads, postal codes, legal articles, decrees or laws are never written with periods, commas or separating whitespaces.")) Turkey, Uruguay, Vietnam.
1,234,567·89	Malaysia, Malta, Philippines (uncommon today), Singapore, Taiwan, United Kingdom (older, typically handwritten; in education)
12,34,567.89	Bangladesh, India, Nepal, Pakistan (see: Indian numbering system).
1234567.89	Bangladesh, India, Nepal, Pakistan (see: Indian numbering system).
1'234'567.89	Switzerland (computing), Liechtenstein.
1'234'567,89	Switzerland (handwriting), Italy (handwriting).
1.234.567'89	Spain (handwriting, used until 1980s, inadvisable use according to the RAE and CSIC).
1234567:89	Sweden (in currencies)

- In Belgium (Dutch), Brazil, Denmark, Germany, Greece, Indonesia, Italy, Netherlands, Portugal, Romania, Russia, Slovenia, Sweden and much of Europe, "1234567,89" or "1.234.567,89" are seen. In handwriting, "1˙234˙567,89" is also seen, but never in Belgium, Brazil, Denmark, Estonia, Germany, the Netherlands, Portugal, Romania, Russia, Slovenia or Sweden. In Italy, a straight apostrophe (') is also used in handwriting: "1'234'567,89". In the Netherlands and Dutch-speaking Belgium, points are used as thousands separators, and is preferred for currency values, but the space is recommended by some style guides, mostly in technical writing.
- In Estonia, currency numbers often use a dot (.) as the decimal separator, and a space as a thousands separator. This is most visible on shopping receipts and in documents that also use other numbers with decimals, such as measurements. This practice is used to better distinguish between prices and other values with decimals. An older convention uses dots to separate thousands (with commas for decimals) – this older practice makes it easier to avoid word breaks with larger numbers.
- Historically, in Germany and Austria, thousands separators were occasionally denoted by alternating uses of commas and points, e.g. "1.234,567.890,12" (or "1.234,567.890·12" in Austria-Hungary and Austria prior to 1938) for "eine Milliarde 234 Millionen ...", but this is not seen today and contemporary German readers would require an explanation to understand it.
- In Switzerland, there are two styles. Currency values use an apostrophe (') as a thousands separator along with a dot (.) as the decimal separator, like "1'234'567.89". For other values, the SI-style "1234567,89" is used, with a comma (,) as the decimal separator. The apostrophe is also the most common thousands separator for non-currency values, like "1'234'567,89".
- In Ireland, Israel, Japan, Korea (both), Malaysia, the Philippines, Singapore, Taiwan, Thailand, the United Kingdom, and the United States, "1,234,567.89" or "1,234,567·89" are seen. However, the latter is generally only found in older, handwritten documents.
- For English-speaking regions of Canada, there are two styles. The preferred style for currency values is "$10,000.00", while the preferred style for numeric values is "1234567.89". However, commas are also sometimes used, despite no longer being taught in school or used in official publications.
- The International System of Units (SI) uses the following two styles: "1234567.89" and "1234567,89". In their own publications, a dot (.) is used in the English version, while a comma (,) is used in the official French version.
- In Sweden, a colon (:) is sometimes used as the decimal separator for currency values, like "1 234 567:89".
- In China, commas and spaces are used to mark digit groups, since dots are used as decimal separators. There is no universal convention on digit grouping, however, so both thousands grouping and no digit grouping can be found. Japan and Taiwan are similar, although, when grouping by myriads, kanji or Chinese characters are frequently used as separators, like the following: "1億2345万6789" or "1億2345萬6789". Commas are used when grouping by thousands.
- In India, which uses the Indian numbering system, commas (,) are used at the thousands, lakh, and crore levels. For example, 10 million (1 crore) would be written "1,00,00,000", while 100 thousand (1 lakh) would be written "1,00,000". In Pakistan, there is a greater tendency to use the standard western system, but the Indian numbering system is used when conducting business in Urdu.

Indian value	Value	Equivalent western notation
One	1	One
Ten	10	Ten
Hundred	100	Hundred
Thousand	1,000	Thousand
Lakh	1,00,000	One hundred thousand
Crore	1,00,00,000	Ten million
Arab (not normally used)	1,00,00,00,000	One billion
Kharab (not normally used)	1,00,00,00,00,000	One hundred billion
Lakh crore	10,00,00,00,00,000	One trillion

== Unicode characters ==
Used with Western Arabic numerals (0123456789):

- U+0020 SPACE
- U+0027 ' APOSTROPHE (&apos;)
- U+002C , COMMA (&comma;)
- U+002E . FULL STOP (&period;) - Full stop punctuation mark.
- U+00B7 · MIDDLE DOT (&middot;, &CenterDot;, &centerdot;)
- U+2009 THIN SPACE (&thinsp;, &ThinSpace;)
- U+202F NARROW NO-BREAK SPACE
- U+02D9 ˙ DOT ABOVE (&DiacriticalDot;, &dot;)
- U+005F _ LOW LINE (&lowbar;, &UnderBar;) - Underscore

Used with Eastern Arabic numerals (٠١٢٣٤٥٦٧٨٩):

- U+066B ٫ ARABIC DECIMAL SEPARATOR
- U+066C ٬ ARABIC THOUSANDS SEPARATOR

Used with keyboards:

- U+2396 ⎖ DECIMAL SEPARATOR KEY SYMBOL (resembles an apostrophe)

== See also ==
- Algorism
- Cifrão
- Decimal floating point
- Decimal place
- Decimal representation
- Scriptio continua
- Rasm
- Space (punctuation)
- Decimal section numbering
- Dot-decimal notation
- International System of Units
- ISO 2145
- RKM code
- Version numbering
