= ISO 31-0 =

Standardized quantities and units

ISO 31-0 is the introductory part of international standard ISO 31 on quantities and units. It provides guidelines for using physical quantities, quantity and unit symbols, and coherent unit systems, especially the SI. It was intended for use in all fields of science and technology and is augmented by more specialized conventions defined in other parts of the ISO 31 standard. ISO 31-0 was withdrawn on 17 November 2009. It is superseded by ISO 80000-1. Other parts of ISO 31 have also been withdrawn and replaced by parts of ISO 80000.

== Scope ==
ISO 31 covers physical quantities used for the quantitative description of physical phenomena. The presentation here is a summary of some of the detailed guidelines and examples given in the standard.

== Quantities and units ==
Physical quantities can be grouped into mutually comparable categories. For example, length, width, diameter and wavelength are all in the same category, that is they are all quantities of the same kind. One particular example of such a quantity can be chosen as a reference quantity, called the unit, and then all other quantities in the same category can be expressed in terms of this unit, multiplied by a number called the numerical value. For example, if we write

the wavelength is λ = 6.982 × 10^{−7} m

then "λ" is the symbol for the physical quantity (wavelength), "m" is the symbol for the unit (metre), and "6.982 × 10^{−7}" is the numerical value of the wavelength in metres.

More generally, we can write

A = {A} ⋅ [A]

where A is the symbol for the quantity, {A} symbolizes the numerical value of A, and [A] represents the corresponding unit in which A is expressed here. Both the numerical value and the unit symbol are factors, and their product is the quantity. A quantity itself has no inherent particular numerical value or unit; as with any product, there are many different combinations of numerical value and unit that lead to the same quantity (e.g., A = 300 ⋅ m = 0.3 ⋅ km = ...). This ambiguity makes the {A} and [A] notations useless, unless they are used together.

The value of a quantity is independent of the unit chosen to represent it. It must be distinguished from the numerical value of the quantity that occurs when the quantity is expressed in a particular unit. The above curly-bracket notation could be extended with a unit-symbol index to clarify this dependency, as in {λ}_{m} = 6.982 × 10^{−7} or equivalently {λ}_{nm} = 698.2. In practice, where it is necessary to refer to the numerical value of a quantity expressed in a particular unit, it is notationally more convenient to simply divide the quantity through that unit, as in

λ/m = 6.982 × 10^{−7}

or equivalently

λ/nm = 698.2.

This is a particularly useful and widely used notation for labelling the axes of graphs or for the headings of table columns, where repeating the unit after each numerical value can be typographically inconvenient.

== Typographic conventions ==
=== Symbols for quantities ===
- Quantities are generally represented by a symbol formed from single letters of the Latin or Greek alphabet.
- Symbols for quantities are set in italic type, independent of the type used in the rest of the text.
- If in a text different quantities use the same letter symbol, they can be distinguished via subscripts.
- A subscript is only set in italic type if it consists of a symbol for a quantity or a variable. Other subscripts are set in upright (roman) type. For example, write V_{n} for a "nominal volume" (where "n" is just an abbreviation for the word "nominal"), but write V_{n} if n is a running index number.

=== Names and symbols for units ===
- If an internationally standardized symbol exists for a unit, then only that symbol should be used. See the SI articles for the list of standard symbols defined by the International System of Units. The distinction between uppercase and lowercase letters is significant for SI unit symbols. For example, "k" is the prefix kilo and "K" stands for the unit kelvin. The symbols of all SI units named after a person or a place start with an uppercase letter, as do the symbols of all prefixes from mega on upwards. All other symbols are lowercase; the only exception is litre, where both l and L are allowed. However, it is stated that the CIPM will examine whether one of the two may be suppressed.
- Symbols for units should be printed in an upright (roman) typeface.

=== Numbers ===
See Sect. 3.3 of the Standard text.

- Numbers should be printed in upright (roman) type.
- ISO 31-0 (after Amendment 2) specifies that "the decimal sign is either the comma on the line or the point on the line". This follows resolution 10 of the 22nd CGPM, 2003.
  For example, one divided by two (one half) may be written as 0.5 or 0,5.
- Numbers consisting of long sequences of digits can be made more readable by separating them into groups, preferably groups of three, separated by a small space. For this reason, ISO 31-0 specifies that such groups of digits should never be separated by a comma or point, as these are reserved for use as the decimal sign.
  For example, one million (1000000) may be written as 1 000 000.
- For numbers whose magnitude is less than 1, the decimal sign should be preceded by a zero.
- The multiplication sign is either a cross or a half-height dot, though the latter should not be used when the dot is the decimal separator.

=== Expressions ===
- Unit symbols follow the numerical value in the expression of a quantity.
- Numerical value and unit symbol are separated by a space. This rule also applies to the symbol "°C" for degrees Celsius, as in "25 °C", and to the percent sign, as in "10 %".
  - The only exceptions are the symbols for the units of plane angle: degree, minute of arc, and second of arc – which follow the numerical value without a space in between ("30 degrees" is expressed by "30°", for example).
- Where quantities are added or subtracted, parenthesis can be used to distribute a unit symbol over several numerical values, as in
  t = 25 s − 3 s = (25 − 3) s
  P = 100 kW ± 5 kW = (100 ± 5) kW
  (but not: 100 ± 5 kW)
  d = 12 × (1 ± 10^{−4}) m
- Products can be written as ab, a b, a⋅b, or a×b. The sign for multiplying numbers is a cross (×) or a half-height dot (⋅). The cross should be used adjacent to numbers if a dot on the line is used as the decimal separator, to avoid confusion between a decimal dot and a multiplication dot.
- Division can be written as $\frac a b$, a/b, or by writing the product of a and b^{−1}, for example a⋅b^{−1}. Numerator or denominator can themselves be products or quotients, but in this case, a solidus (/) should not be followed by a multiplication sign or division sign on the same line, unless parentheses are used to avoid ambiguity.

=== Mathematical signs and symbols ===
A comprehensive list of internationally standardized mathematical symbols and notations can be found in ISO 31-11.

== See also ==
- ISO 31
- ISO 1000
- SI
- ISO 31-11
- ISO 80000, ISO 80000-1

== Bibliography ==
- International standard ISO 31-0: Quantities and units — Part 0: General principles. International Organization for Standardization, Geneva, 1992.
- SI brochure. Bureau International des Poids et Mesures.
- Cvitas, T (February 2002), Quantity calculus, Interdivisional Committee on Terminology, Nomenclature and Symbols (IUPAC), archived from the original on 2005-04-04.
- I. M. Mills and W. V. Metanomski: On the use of italic and roman fonts for symbols in scientific text. Interdivisional Committee on Nomenclature and Symbols, IUPAC, December 1999.
- B. N. Taylor and A. Thompson: The International System of Units (SI). NIST Special Publication 330. US National Institute of Standards and Technology, 2008.
- A. Thompson and B. N. Taylor: Guide for the use of the International System of Units (SI). NIST Special Publication 811. US National Institute of Standards and Technology, 2008.
- Unit rules and style conventions – Check list for reviewing manuscripts. US National Institute of Standards and Technology, 1998.
