= Taiwan Quality Food Association =

- Founded: TaiwanTaipei
- Headquarters: 11F., No. 75, Sec. 2, Chongqing S. Rd., Zhongzheng Dist., Taipei City 10075, Taiwan, R.O.C
- Key people: Yao-wen Huang, Chairperson
- Website: http://www.tqf.org.tw/

The Taiwan Quality Food Association (TQF Association) is a juridical association responsible for the management of the Taiwan Quality Food (TQF) Product Certification Scheme, which is in compliance with GHP, GMP and HACCP standards requirements, and also to provide guidelines and support for the food industry to voluntarily implement food safety management system. TQF Association's five main core functions are as follow:

1. Harmonization of TQF certification with international food safety standards.
2. Authorization of independent and impartial third-party certification bodies to assess compliance with TQF standards.
3. Supervision and monitoring of certification bodies for the TQF Product Certification Scheme by an independent and impartial third-party accreditation body Taiwan Accreditation Foundation.
4. Implement unannounced and unscheduled annual surveillance auditing.
5. Promotion of a comprehensive upgrade on the professional competences of the food industry.

== Duties ==
1. Establish a food safety management scheme to ensure safe and quality foods are delivered to consumers
2. Drive changes and continuous improvement in align with global food safety management systems and requirements
3. Drive for continuous improvement in enhancing services and quality offered by entire food supply chain
4. Conduct professional training, academic research and promotion to enhance industry standard on food safety
5. Establish a mutual communication platform for members
6. Others in accordance with TQF mission

== Services ==
1. Provide consultation for food sanitation and safety regulation and labelling
2. Establish TQF product certification scheme via on-line registration
3. Provide consultation on FDA's regulation for supplier compulsory entry to "Food Traceability System", which will covers upstream tracing and downstream tracking of ingredients, production, processing, distribution and sales
4. Provide consumers a platform to consult food safety requirements
5. Promote TQF product certification scheme
6. Promote food industry self-regulation and international standards gearing

== Establishment ==
In 1983, the Industrial Development Bureau (IDB) under the Ministry of Economic Affairs (MOEA) of the Republic of China, Taiwan, introduced for the first time the US Good manufacturing practice (GMP) system into Taiwan, actively promoting the Taiwan Food GMP Certification System, and encouraging food enterprises to voluntarily certify for the food GMP standard. In 1994, GMP certified food enterprises established the “Taiwan Food GMP Association” in order to promote the food GMP Certification System.

In 2000, the food GMP officially entered the period of “Joint Promotion of Government and Private Sector”, in which the government and the food industry private sector cooperate with each other to actively promote food GMP and enhance acceptance and public trust in food manufacturing. Taiwan Food GMP Association functioned as a bridge between the government, industry and consumers, promoting the voluntary implementation of food safety management system by the food industry.

In March 2015, food safety issues were brought to the public's attention, in response to this and to make Taiwan food safety and quality certification system to be more open, transparent, and independent, Taiwan Food GMP Association made its transition to Taiwan Quality Food (TQF) Association, extending the invitation to raw material/food ingredients/additive industry, wholesalers, retailers, academia experts and consumer groups joining forces to ensure food safety. Additionally, with the hope of achieving future international recognition by the Global Food Safety Initiative (GFSI) and bring Taiwan up to the international level.

In June 2015, the IDB officially transferred the “Taiwan Food Good Manufacturing Practices (Food GMP) Certification Program”, including its management system and the GMP certification mark, to the Taiwan Quality Food (TQF) Association. TQF Association obtained the intellectual property rights of the registered mark in September 2015, and starting promoting the TQF Product Certification System, while in charge of the management and supervision of the mark.

An impartial third-party accreditation body, the Taiwan Accreditation Foundation (TAF), which is an officially recognized accreditation body and a member of the International Accreditation Forum (IAF) signatory to the Multilateral Recognition Arrangement (MLA), is responsible for the accreditation and supervision of certifications bodies for the TQF Product Certification Scheme.

Hereafter, TQF Association undertook the role of IDB to assist food manufacturers in Taiwan, with the mission of supporting them in transitioning from GMP to TQF certification. Within this context, Dr. Bonnie Sun Pan was appointed by the TQF Board of Directors as the chairperson to lead the TQF Association towards internationalization.

== See also ==
- Food safety incidents in Taiwan
- Food safety incidents in China
