= IDDM =

IDDM may refer to:

- Insulin-dependent diabetes mellitus, known as Type 1 diabetes
- Integrated diver display mask, a diving mask
