= IEC-P27-1 =

8-bit character set developed by the IEC

IEC-P27-1 (or ISO IR-143) is an 8-bit character set developed by the IEC. When combined with the ISO/IEC 646 character set, this includes all characters required to print the symbols defined in IEC 60027-1. FreeDOS calls it code page 65502.

== Character set ==
IEC-P27-1
	0	1	2	3	4	5	6	7	8	9	A	B	C	D	E	F
0x																
1x																
2x	SP	!	"	#	$	%	&	'	(	)	*	+	,	-	.	/
3x	0	1	2	3	4	5	6	7	8	9	:	;	<	=	>	?
4x	@	A	B	C	D	E	F	G	H	I	J	K	L	M	N	O
5x	P	Q	R	S	T	U	V	W	X	Y	Z	[	\	]		_
6x	`	a	b	c	d	e	f	g	h	i	j	k	l	m	n	o
7x	p	q	r	s	t	u	v	w	x	y	z	{	|	}	~	
8x																
9x																
Ax	ˇ 02C7	≡ 2261	∧ 2227	∨ 2228	∩ 2229	∪ 222A	⊂ 2282	⊃ 2283	⇐ 21D0	⇒ 21D2	∴ 2234	∵ 2235	∈ 2208	∋ 220B	⊆ 2286	⊇ 2287
Bx	∫ 222B	∮ 222E	∞ 221E	∇ 2207	∂ 2202	∼ 223C	≈ 2248	≃ 2243	≅ 2245	≤ 2264	≠ 2260	≥ 2265	↔ 2194	¬ 00AC	∀ 2200	∃ 2203
Cx	ℵ 2135	□ 25A1	∥ 2225	Γ 0393	Δ 0394	⊥ 22A5	∠ 2220	∟ 221F	Θ 0398	⟨ 27E8	⟩ 27E9	Λ 039B	′ 2032	″ 2033	Ξ 039E	∓ 2213
Dx	Π 03A0	² 00B2	Σ 03A3	× 00D7	³ 00B3	Υ 03A5	Φ 03A6	· 00B7	Ψ 03A8	Ω 03A9	∅ 2205	⇀ 21C0	√ 221A	ƒ 0192	∝ 221D	± 00B1
Ex	° 00B0	α 03B1	β 03B2	γ 03B3	δ 03B4	ε 03B5	ζ 03B6	η 03B7	θ 03B8	ι 03B9	κ 03BA	λ 03BB	μ 03BC	ν 03BD	ξ 03BE	‰ 2030
Fx	π 03C0	ρ 03C1	σ 03C3	÷ 00F7	τ 03C4	υ 03C5	φ 03C6	χ 03C7	ψ 03C8	ω 03C9	†; 2020	← 2190	↑ 2191	→ 2192	↓ 2193	‾ 203E
