= IEC 60027 =

Technical standard for letter symbols

IEC 60027 (formerly IEC 27) is a technical international standard for letter symbols published by the International Electrotechnical Commission (IEC), comprising the following parts:

- IEC 60027-1: General
- IEC 60027-2: Telecommunications and electronics
- IEC 60027-3: Logarithmic and related quantities, and their units
- IEC 60027-4: Symbols for quantities to be used for rotating electrical machines
- IEC 60027-6: Control technology
- IEC 60027-7: Physiological quantities and units

A closely related international standard on quantities and units is ISO 31. The ISO 31 and IEC 60027 standards are being revised by the two standardization organizations in collaboration. The revised harmonized standard is known as ISO/IEC 80000, Quantities and units. It supersedes ISO 31 and part of IEC 60027.

== Content ==
=== IEC 60027-2 ===
IEC 60027-2 Amendment 2, as published in January 1999, was the first international standard defining the binary prefixes, as proposed by International Electrotechnical Commission (IEC) since 1996 (kibi- (Ki), mebi- (Mi), gibi- (Gi) and tebi- (Ti)) but extended them up to pebi (Pi) and exbi- (Ei). This did not change in the second edition of the standard, published in 2000, but the third edition in 2005 added prefixes zebi- (Zi) and yobi- (Yi). The harmonized ISO/IEC IEC 80000-13:2008 standard supersedes subclauses 3.8 and 3.9 of IEC 60027-2:2005. The only significant change is the addition of explicit definitions for some quantities.

=== IEC 60027-3 ===
IEC 60027-3, as published in 2002, defines the logarithmic units decibel and neper.

== See also ==
- IEC-P27-1 – 8-bit character set developed by the IEC
