= Diving mask =

Face cover to improve underwater vision

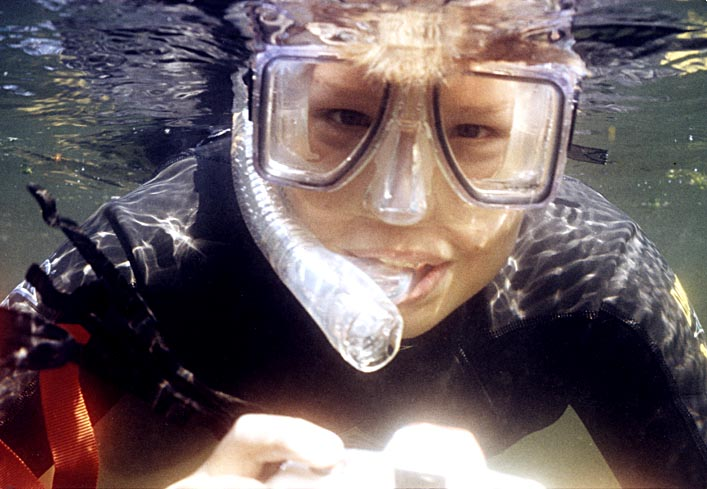
- A snorkeller wearing a clear silicone diving mask
- Other names: Half mask; Scuba mask; Free-diving mask; Snorkelling mask
- Uses: Provides clear underwater vision for divers
- Related items: Full-face mask, Swimming goggles

A diving mask (also half mask, free-diving mask, snorkelling mask or scuba mask) is an item of diving equipment that allows underwater divers, including scuba divers, underwater hockey players, underwater rugby players, free-divers, and snorkellers to clearly see underwater. Surface supplied divers usually use a full face mask or diving helmet, but in some systems the half mask may be used. When the human eye is in direct contact with water as opposed to air, its normal environment, light entering the eye is refracted by a different angle and the eye is unable to focus the light on the retina. By providing an air space in front of the eyes, the eye is able to focus nearly normally. The shape of the air space in the mask slightly affects the ability to focus. Corrective lenses can be fitted to the inside surface of the viewport or contact lenses may be worn inside the mask to allow normal vision for people with focusing defects.

When the diver descends, the ambient pressure rises, and it becomes necessary to equalise the pressure inside the mask with the external ambient pressure to avoid the barotrauma known as mask squeeze. This is done by allowing sufficient air to flow out through the nose into the mask to relieve the pressure difference, which requires the nose to be included in the airspace of the mask. Equalisation during ascent is automatic as excess air inside the mask easily leaks out past the seal.

A wide range of viewport shapes and internal volumes are available, and each design will generally fit some shapes of face better than others. A good comfortable fit and a reliable seal around the edges of the rubber skirt is important to the correct function of the mask. National and international standards relating to diving masks provide a means of ensuring that they are manufactured to a suitable quality.

== Function ==
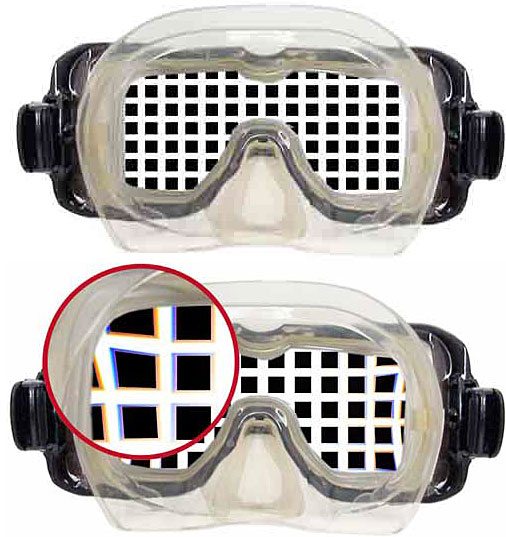
Views through a flat mask, above and below water

Light rays bend when they travel from one medium to another; the amount of bending is determined by the refractive indices of the two media. If one medium has a particular curved shape, it functions as a lens. The cornea, humours, and crystalline lens of the eye together form a lens system that focuses images on the retina. Our eyes are adapted for viewing in air. Water, however, has approximately the same refractive index as the cornea (both about 1.33), so immersion effectively eliminates the cornea's focusing properties. When our eyes are in water, instead of focusing images on the retina, they now focus them far behind the retina, resulting in an extremely blurred image from hypermetropia.

By wearing a flat diving mask, humans can see clearly under water. The scuba mask's flat window separates the eyes from the surrounding water by a layer of air. Light rays entering from water into the flat parallel window change their direction minimally within the window material itself. But when these rays exit the window into the air space between the flat window and the eye, the refraction is quite noticeable. The view paths refract (bend) in a manner similar to viewing fish kept in an aquarium.

Refraction of light entering the mask makes objects appear about 34% bigger and 25% nearer when underwater. Also, pincushion distortion and lateral chromatic aberration are noticeable. As the diver descends in clean water, the water acts as a colour filter eliminating the red end of the visible spectrum of the sunlight entering the water leaving only the blue end of the spectrum. Depending on the depth and clarity of the water, eventually all sunlight is blocked and the diver has to rely on artificial light sources to see underwater.

== Construction ==
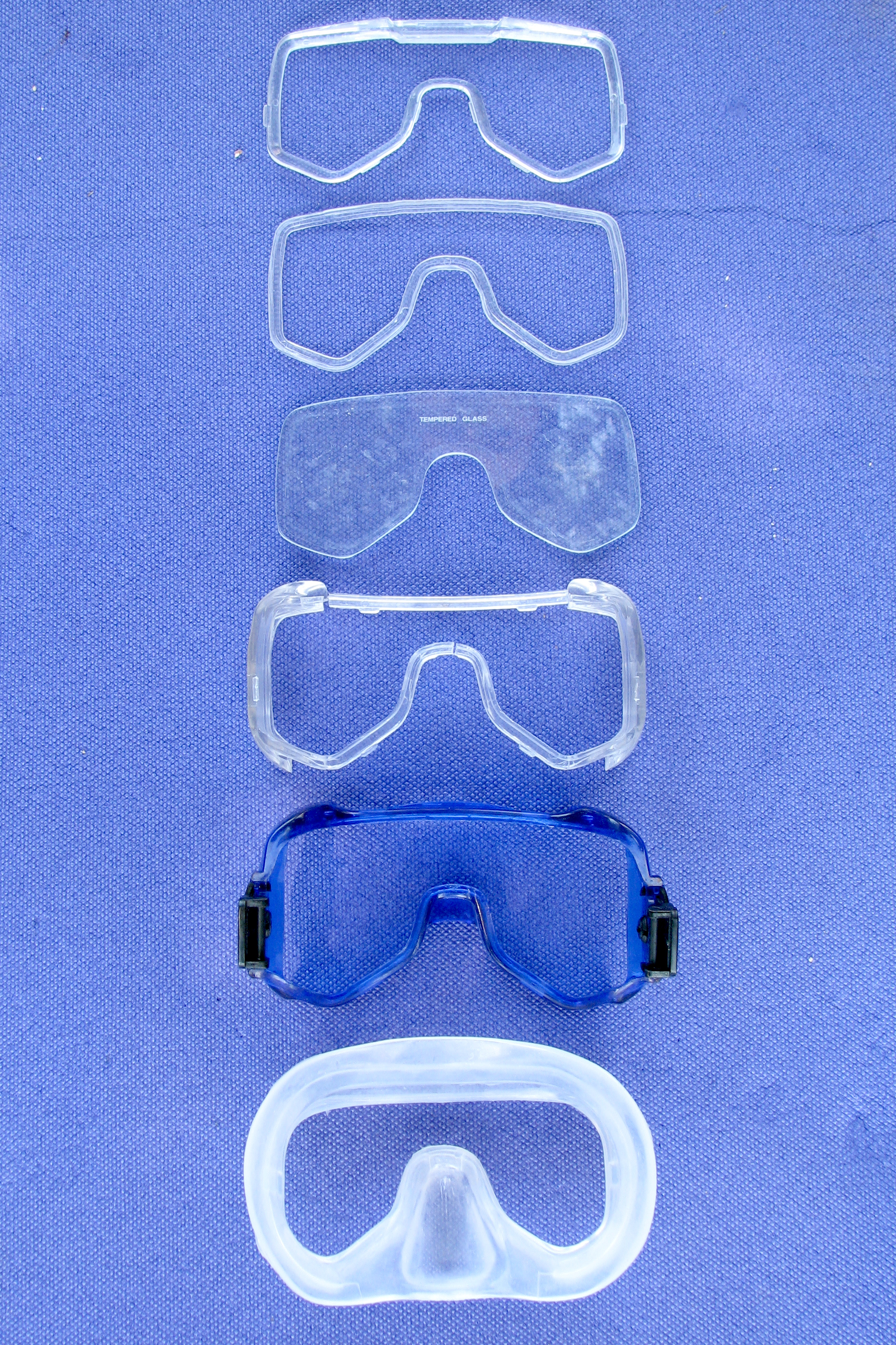
Disassembled components of a single-window, low-volume dive mask

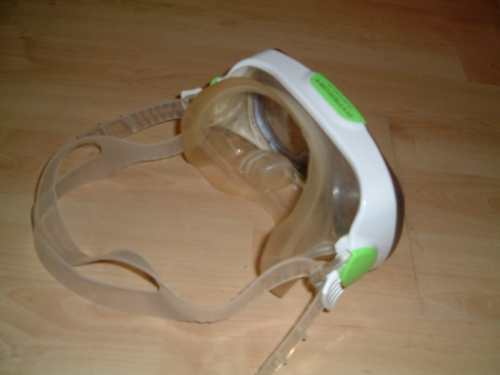
Assembled diving half-mask showing the retaining strap

There are two basic categories of diving masks: the half mask covers the eyes and nose, and the full face mask covers eyes, nose and mouth, and therefore includes a part of the breathing apparatus. The half-mask is described here.

Diving masks may have a single, durable, tempered glass faceplate, or two lenses in front of the eyes. These may be supported by a relatively rigid plastic or metal frame, or they may be permanently bonded to the rim of the skirt, in a construction known as "frameless". In the case of freediving masks, which need to have a low internal volume to minimize the amount of breath needed to equalize the change of pressure that occurs with depth, the lenses may be made of polycarbonate plastic. The best scuba masks are sealed well. There is usually a "skirt" of synthetic rubber or silicone elastomer to support the frame and lenses and create a watertight seal with the diver's face. The skirt material may be almost transparent, translucent or opaque. A nearly transparent skirt provides a greater peripheral vision, though somewhat distorted, and may reduce the feeling of claustrophobia in some divers, but in some cases the light entering through the sides may cause distracting internal reflections. The skirt also encloses the nose, usually by means of a nose pocket, so that air can be exhaled through the nose into the mask to equalise the internal pressure during descent and thereby avoid possible barotrauma of the enclosed area of the face. The section of the mask covering the nose must allow the wearer to block the nostrils while equalising pressure in the middle ear. All diving masks have means to keep them in position, usually an elastomer strap of similar material to the skirt, but occasionally an expanded neoprene pad with velcro straps is used. Mask straps are usually wider at the back or split into an upper and lower strap at the back of the head for stability and comfort.

Some masks had a one-way purge valve under the nose to let water out, but this is no longer common as they were neither necessary nor reliable, and often leaked.

=== Manufacturing standards ===
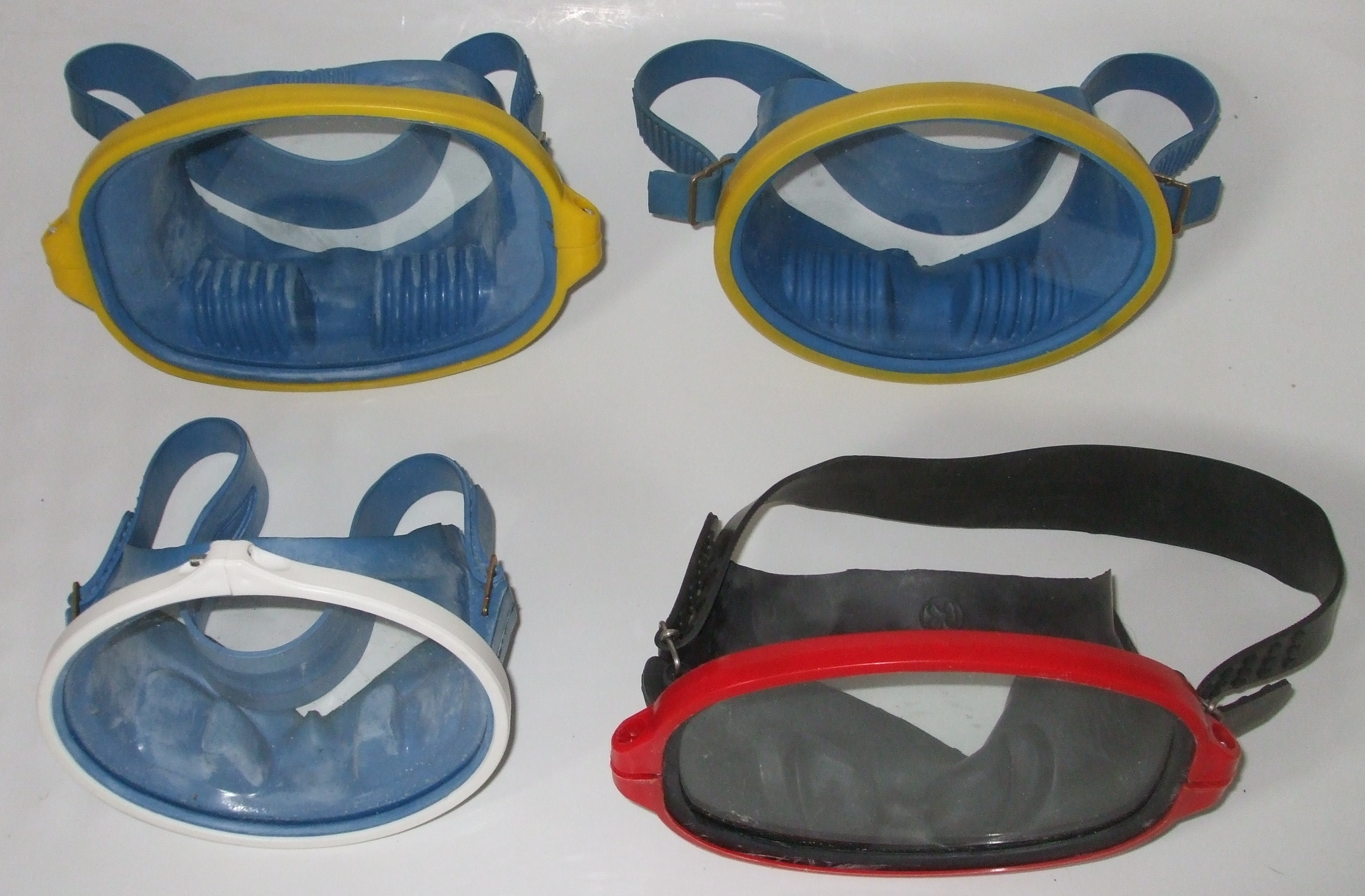
GOST 20568:1975 compliant Russian and Ukrainian diving masks

Nine national and international standards relating to diving masks are known to exist: British standard BS 4532:1969 (amended 1977); USSR and CIS standard GOST 20568:1975 (Active); German standard DIN 7877:1980; Polish Industry Standard BN-82/8444-17.01 (Active). American national standard ANSI Z87.11:1985 (Active); Austrian standard ÖNORM S 4225:1988; Chinese national standard CNS 12497:1989 (Active); Chinese national standard CNS 12498:1989 (Active); and European standard EN 16805:2015 (Active).

== Visual correction ==
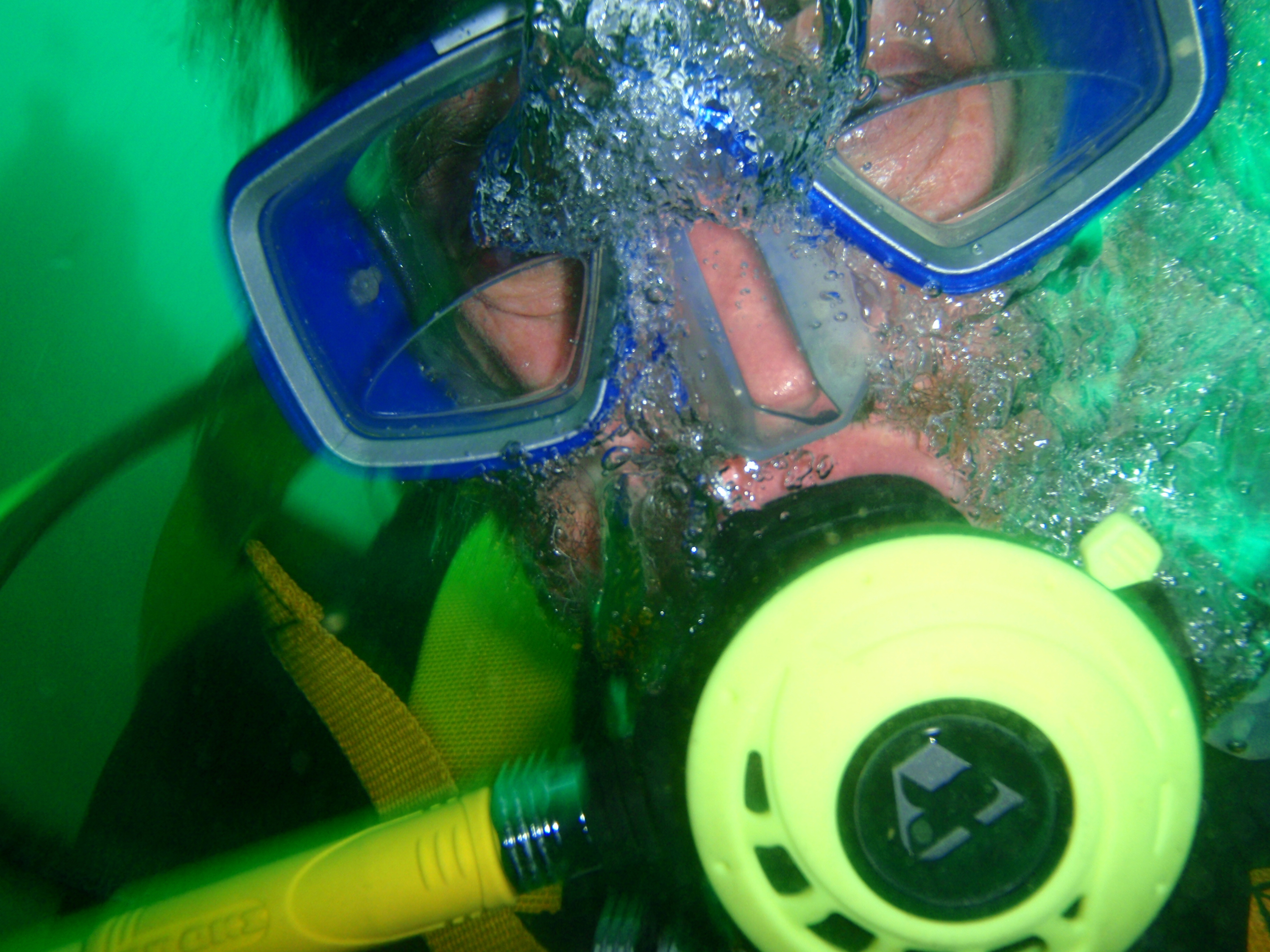
Scuba diver with bifocal lenses in half mask

Diving masks can be fitted with prescription lenses for divers needing optical correction to improve vision. Corrective lenses are ground flat on one side and optically cemented to the inside face of the mask lens. This provides the same amount of correction above and below the surface of the water. Bifocal lenses are also available for this application. Some masks are made with removable lenses, and a range of standard corrective lenses are available which can be fitted. Plastic self-adhesive lenses that can be applied to the inside of the mask may fall off if the mask is flooded for a significant period. Contact lenses may be worn under a mask or helmet, but there is some risk of losing them if the mask is dislodged in turbulent water.

== Fit ==
A mask is considered to fit well when it seals comfortably and effectively all round the skirt, and provides a good field of vision, without pressing on the nose or forehead while in use underwater. A low internal volume is considered desirable by freedivers, as less breath is wasted to equalise, and by scuba divers, as there is less tendency to press up under the nose due to buoyancy, which becomes uncomfortable quite quickly.

Divers may test whether a mask is a good fit by placing it on their face, without using the straps, and gently inhaling through their nose. If the mask stays on without any help this indicates that no air is being drawn in and that the skirt is in sufficient contact with the facial skin all the way round the mask. Optimum sealing requires that hair strands do not cross under the edge of the seal, as they can provide a path for water to leak into the mask. This is more a problem with the forehead hairline than with lower facial hair, as water from the top tends to run into the eyes, while water pooling at the bottom is easily purged by exhaling a small volume of air through the nose. Most bearded divers learn to manage the slight leakage without difficulty, inconvenience, or greasing the moustache. Other factors affecting a comfortable fit are sufficient space for the nose in the nose pocket, no contact between the rigid mask frame and the bridge of the nose, and no excessive pressure on the forehead. There should also be sufficient space between the mask lenses and the face that the eyelashes do not contact the glass noticeably when blinking.

== Use ==
The strap can be adjusted to suit the diver's head. Too loose may not provide an effective seal and the mask may dislodge easily, and too tight may result in discomfort or pain. Correct positioning of the strap around the back of the head will reduce the risk of dislodging and facilitate clearing.

When entering the water while wearing the mask, the diver may need to manually prevent water impact from dislodging or knocking off the mask. Alternatively, a diver can enter the water with the mask off and then put it on or use an entry method which does not result in fast water flow over the mask. Wearing the mask pushed up onto the forehead while out of the water or on the surface increases the risk of the mask falling or being knocked off.

To prevent a mask from fogging up due to condensation on the glass many divers spit into the dry mask before use, spread the saliva around the inside of the plate and rinse it out with a little water. The saliva residue allows condensation to wet the glass and form a continuous film, rather than form droplets. There are commercial products that can be used as an alternative to the saliva method, some of which are more effective and last longer.

Standard maintenance is to rinse inside and out with clean, fresh water after each day's use, and allow to dry out of direct sunlight before storage. Ultraviolet light degrades the synthetic materials of the skirt and frame. A well-maintained mask should last for several years. The strap is the most stressed component and is often the first part to fail, but can usually be replaced. Inspection of the strap for cracks and tears before use can reduce the risk of failure during a dive.

Mask removal and refitting underwater and clearing are basic skills that all divers must learn so that they can deal with flooding and leaks or the mask being dislodged without panic.

=== Mask clearing ===
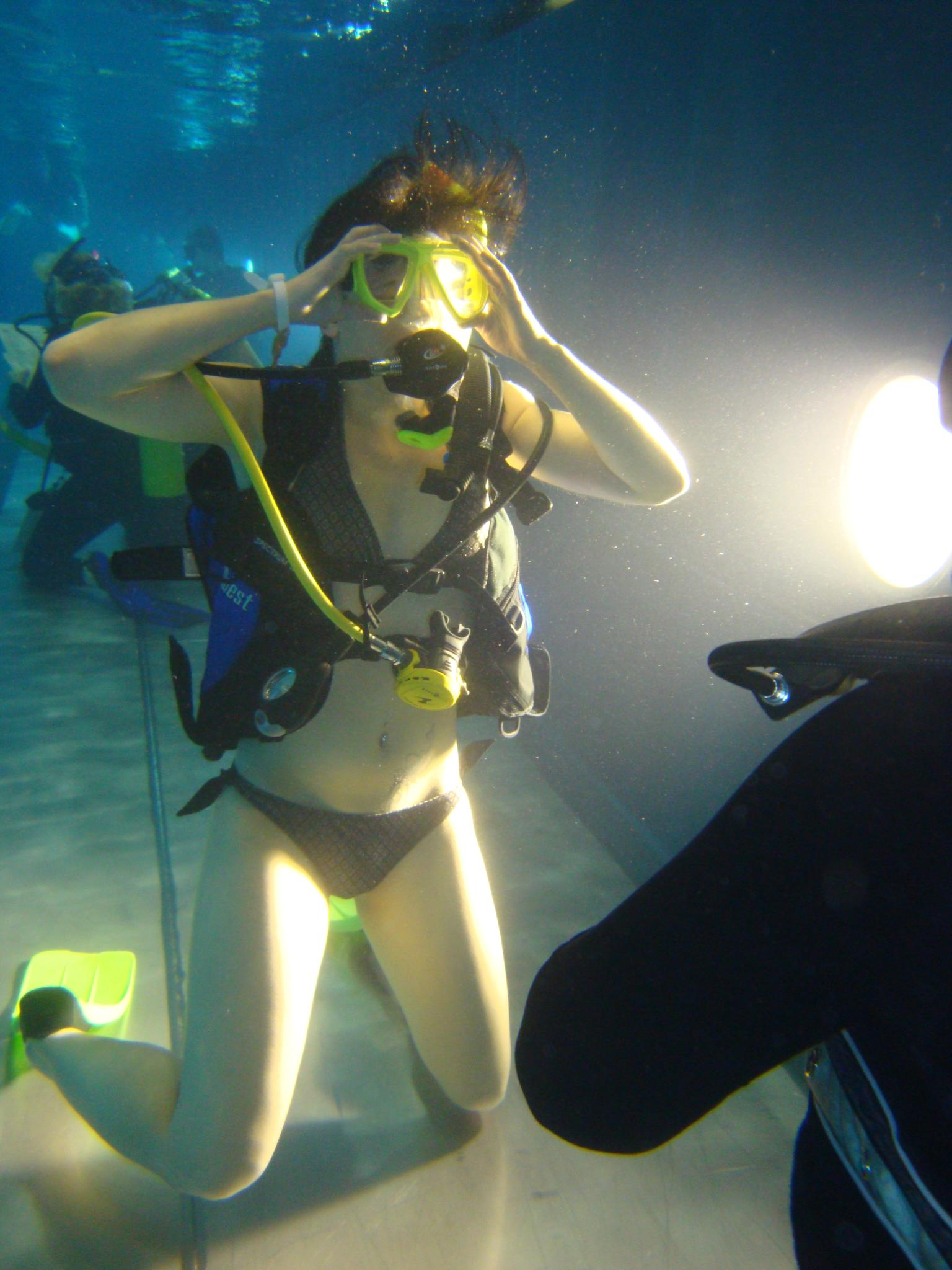
Practising mask clearing during entry level training

It is quite common for water to leak into the mask, which can be annoying, or interfere with clear vision, and the diver needs to be able to get rid of the water quickly and effectively. Reasons for the leakage include poor fit or fitting, leaking via head or facial hair, movement of the facial muscles causing temporary leaks, or impact of external objects against the mask, which may distort it temporarily, or move it so that it leaks, or in extreme cases dislodge it entirely from the diver's head.

The methods of clearing differ between the half mask, which covers the eyes and nose, and the full-face mask, which also covers the mouth. If the mask has a purge valve and the strap tension is correct, the diver holds the head so that the valve is at the lowest point and exhales through the nose. If the mask is a good fit on the diver's face and the strap is correctly placed, exhaling through the nose will usually drive water out along the bottom edge of the skirt. It may be necessary to press the upper part of the mask against the face to improve the seal if the diver is rolled to one side. If the fit is not perfect, or the strap is too low, contact pressure of the top edge against the forehead may be insufficient to maintain a seal when the head is upright.

=== Equalising ===
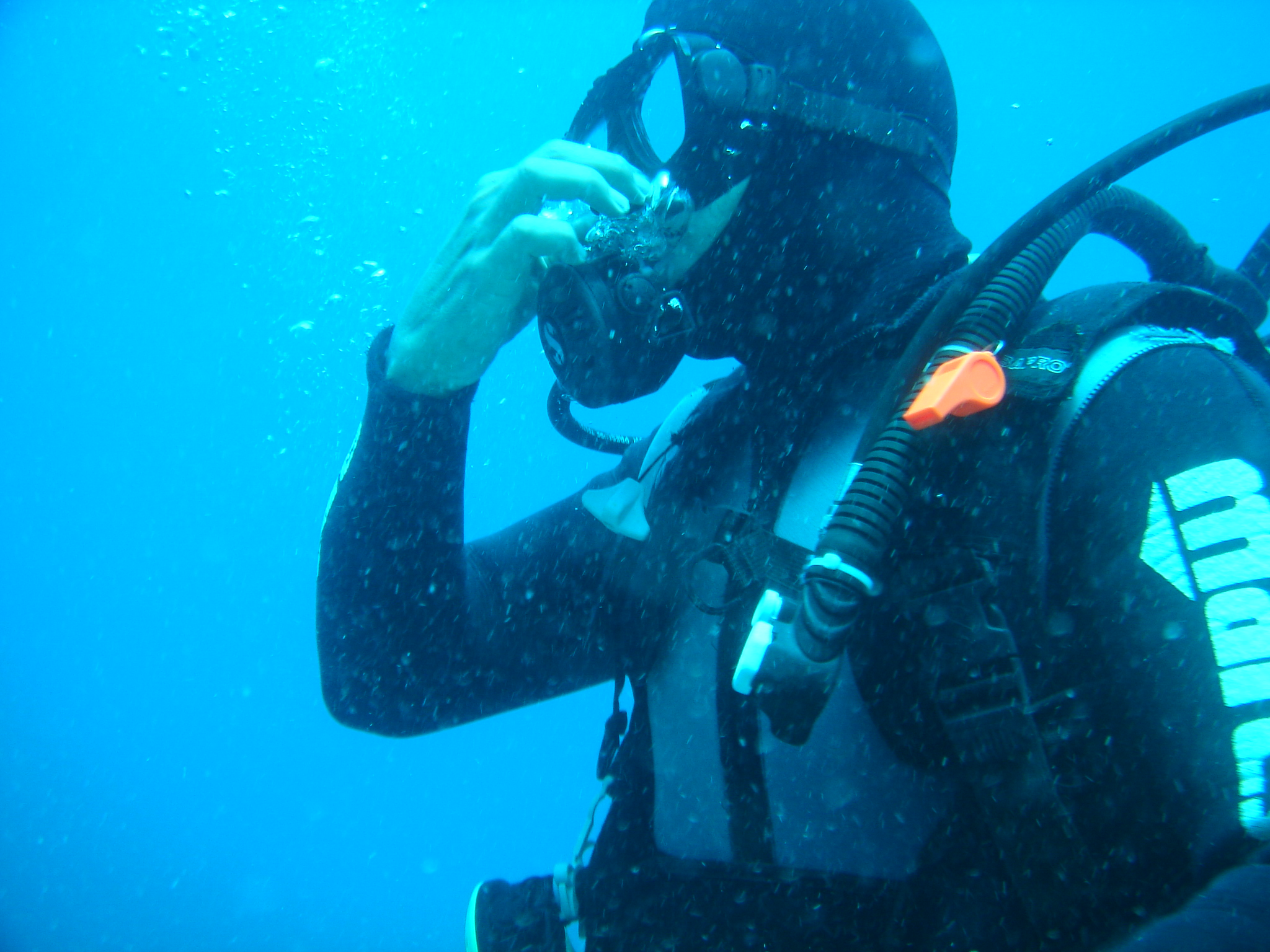
Pinching the nose while clearing the ears on descent

The pressure changes during ascent and descent may affect gas spaces in the diver and diving equipment. A change in pressure will cause a pressure difference between the gas space and environment which will cause the gas to expand or compress if that is possible, and constraining the gas from expanding or compressing to balance the pressure may cause damage to the surrounding material or tissues by over-expansion or crushing. Some gas spaces, such as the mask, will automatically release excess gas as it expands during ascent, but have to be equalized during compression of descent.

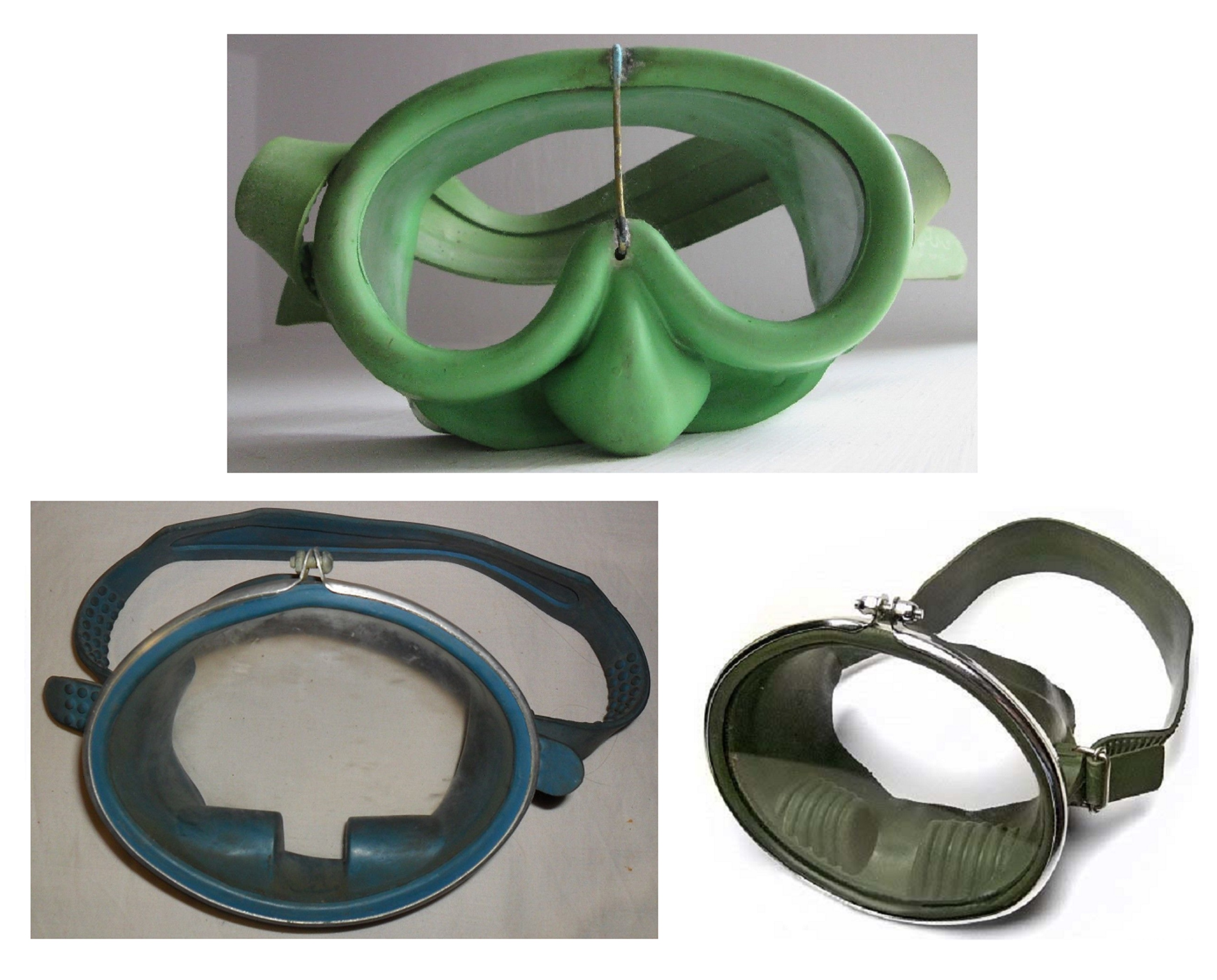
Diving mask compensator nose-hold types. Top row: External nose-hold with nasal recess at front. Bottom row: Internal nose-hold in lower part of mask with finger wells on outside and plain or accordion bosses on inside

Equalising of the mask is an essential skill for any form of diving. Goggles that do not cover the nose can not be equalised and are unsuitable for diving. The mask is equalised by exhaling sufficient air through the nose to provide a balanced internal pressure. Any excess will simply leak out around the skirt. Equalising (or clearing) the ears is necessary to prevent barotrauma to the middle and inner ear. Some divers need to pinch the nostrils closed as part of their equalisation technique, and this must be allowed for in the design of the mask skirt.

Compensators are external or internal nose-hold devices enabling diving mask wearers to pinch their nostrils when equalising pressure in the ears. Located at the front of the mask, an external nose-hold comprises a hollow elastic nasal recess. Moulded on the lower part of the mask, an internal nose-hold has finger wells on the outside and hollow elastic bosses on the inside with a gap between them to accommodate the nose.

== Types of diving half-mask ==
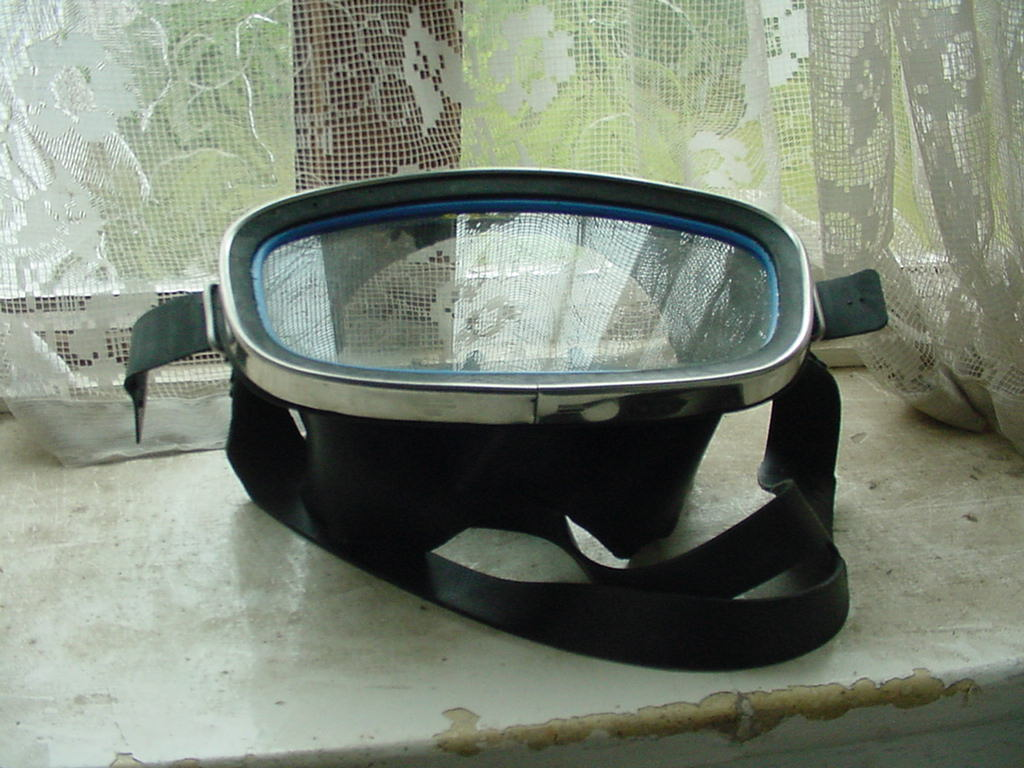
Older diving mask with one big window

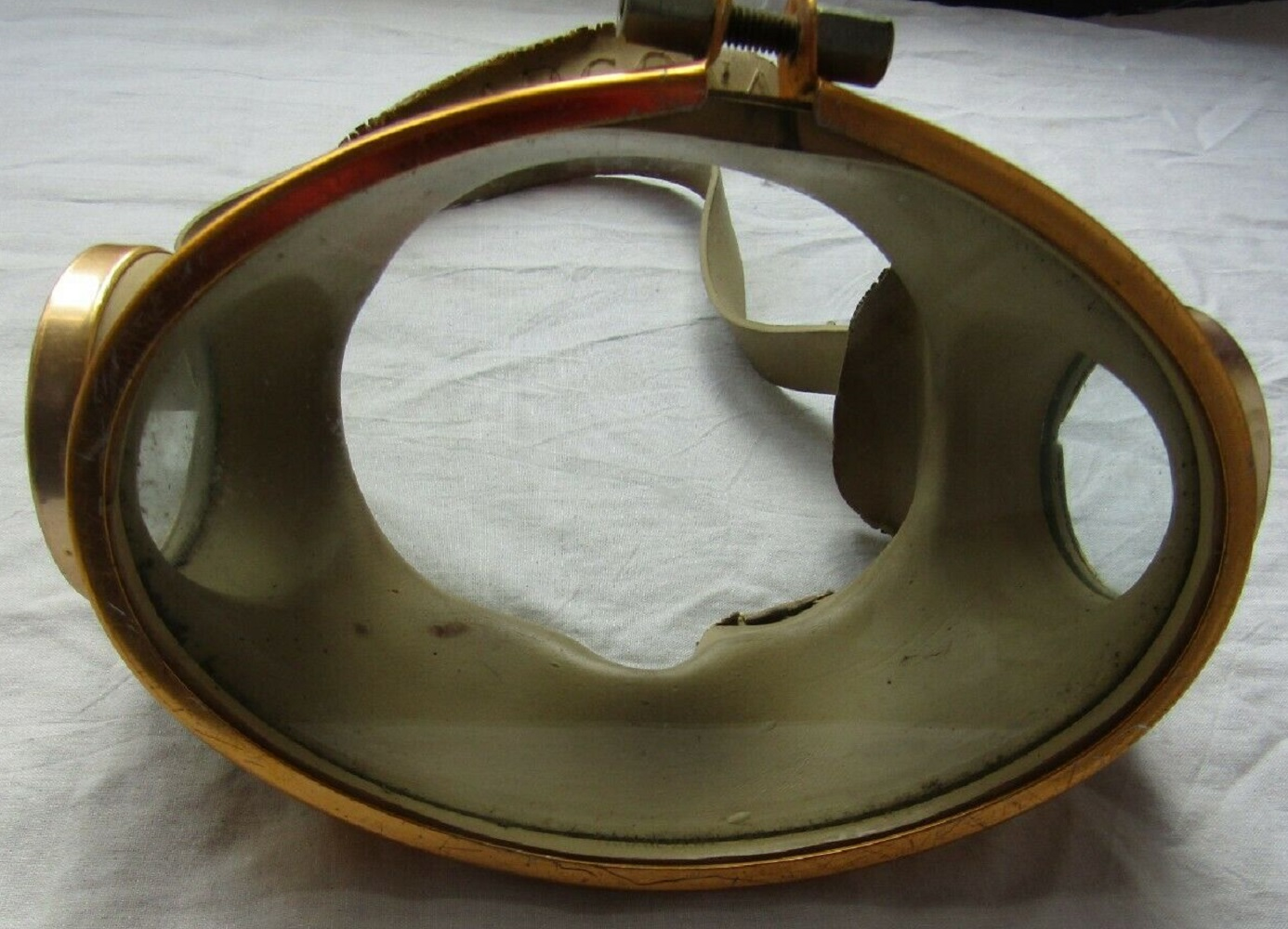
Late-1950s diving mask fitted with side windows for panoramic vision

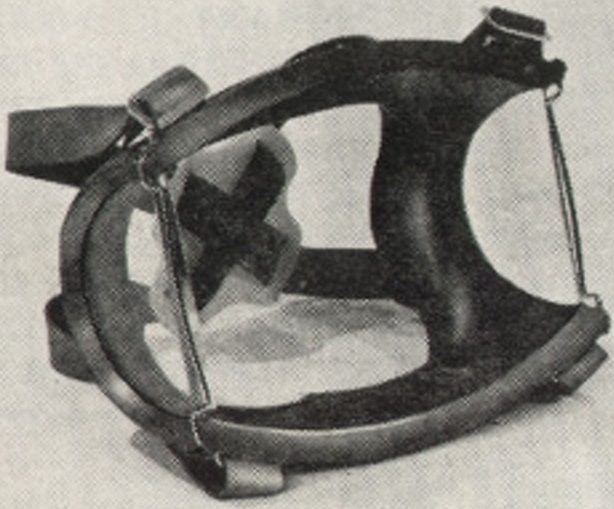
Early-1960s wraparound diving mask claiming 180-degree vision

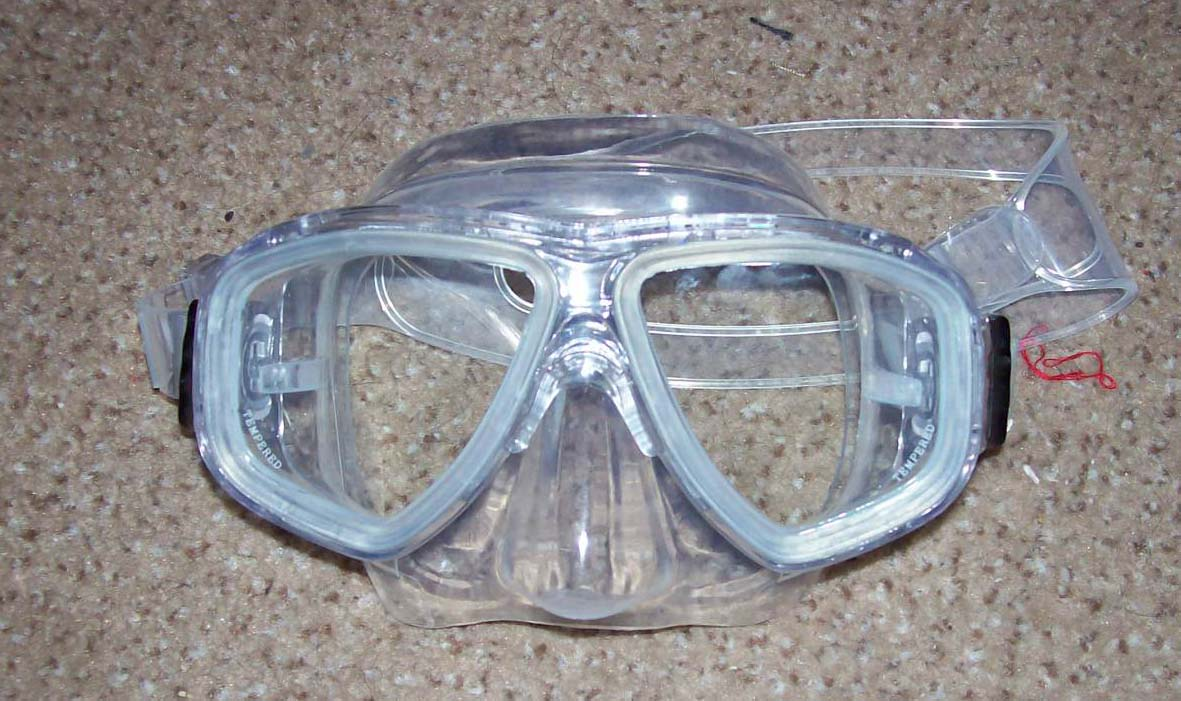
A two-window, soft-silicone dive mask without purge valve

A HydroOptix Double-Dome mask

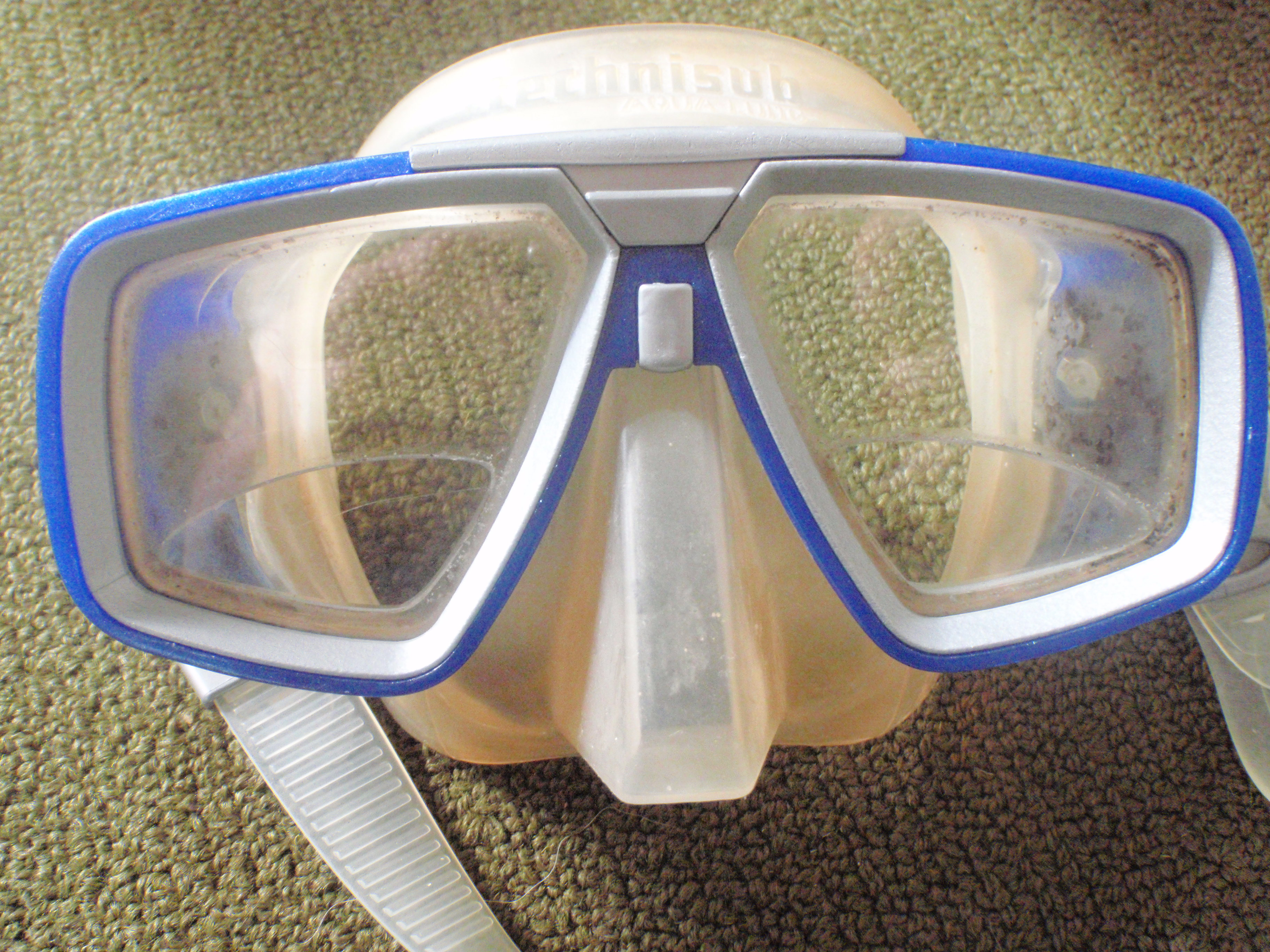
Mask with bifocal lenses for reading instruments

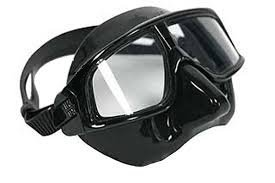
A twin-lens, low-volume diving mask with wide peripheral view of the type favoured by many underwater hockey players.

Early diving masks were made with a single pane of glass or transparent plastic, usually elliptical, but sometimes circular or approximately rectangular or triangular with rounded sides and corners. In the late-1950s and early-1960s, certain models were fitted with multiple or wraparound lenses claiming 180-degree vision. Others came with indentations in the skirt at the bottom on either side of the nose, into which the diver can insert a thumb and forefinger to pinch the nose, when performing a valsalva maneuver to clear their ears. This design was improved by bringing the window closer to the face, reducing the volume of air inside the mask, thus making mask clearing easier. The window has a cutout to fit around the nose, which is covered by the rubber or silicone material of the skirt. This facilitates pinching the nose when ear-clearing.

A further development is the mask with two windows, one for each eye. It can have the windows closer to the face than the one-window type, and therefore contain less internal volume for the diver to clear or equalise, and a lower buoyancy. These types are often called a "low-volume mask". Participants in the sport of underwater hockey are required to use twin-lens masks of this type for their safety – the sport uses a heavy lead puck similar to an ice hockey puck, but skillful players can flick the puck a considerable height off the bottom when making passes which leads to the possibility of accidental puck contact with other players. Should a puck hit the lens of a single-lens mask it may break the glass and pass through the aperture to hit the face and eyes, but with a twin-lens mask, though the glass may break, the frame will prevent the passage of the puck any further.

Recent innovations have produced more complex designs, intended to provide extra features:

- The double-dome mask. This was invented by HydroOptix. Double-dome masks allow a wider field of view and avoid the refraction error in perceived distance and size of objects. Underwater the curved mask windows make the diver's vision effectively more hyperopic, or less myopic, and the diver must wear special contact lenses to compensate (unless their eyes are myopic to the right amount to compensate exactly for the refraction at the curved mask windows). The diver's vision will become myopic when they put their head out of water with the contact lenses in.
- The "Data Mask", or integrated diver display mask, developed by Oceanic, is a half mask with a built-in LCD head up display which displays various dive and breathing set conditions including the function of a diving computer, depth and tank pressures.

== Alternative equipment ==
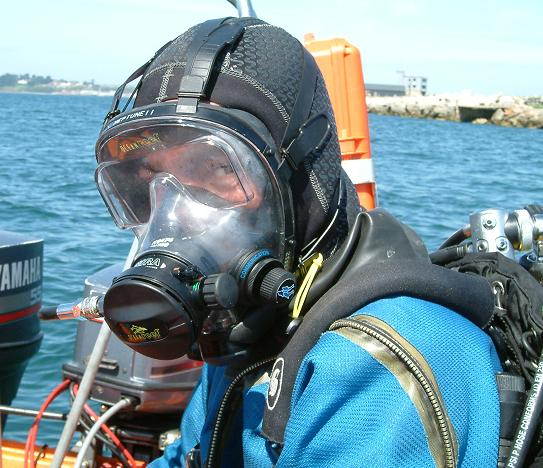
Diver wearing a lightweight full face mask

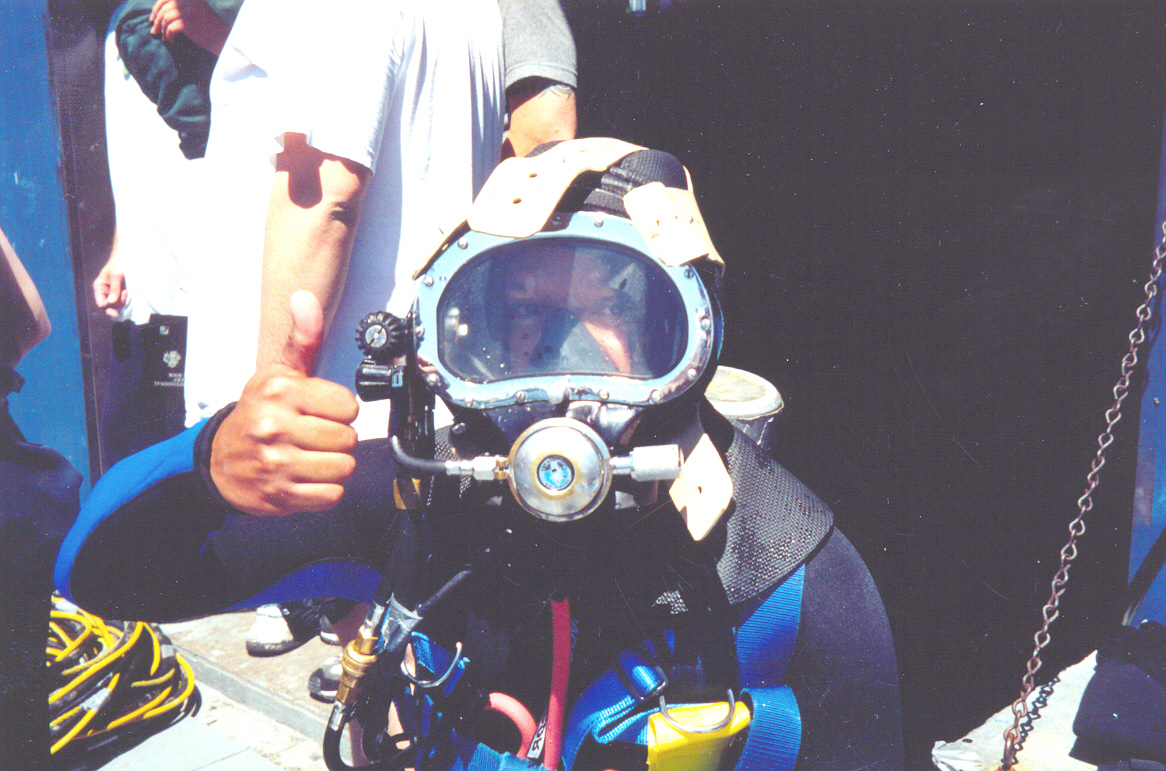
Diver wearing heavy duty Kirby-Morgan band mask

There are other types of equipment for underwater vision enhancement:

- Full face diving mask – often worn by working divers who need underwater verbal communication ability.
- Lightweight demand diving helmet – usually worn by divers using surface supplied diving equipment.
- Copper standard diving helmet – part of the early standard diving dress or other free-flow helmet.
- Fluid filled mask – the need to equilibrate the internal pressure in the mask by exhaling air through the nose reduces the freediver's capacity to dive deep. Masks or swimming goggles with high power lenses (40-200 diopters) have been developed which are filled with water or saline fluid, which do not need to be equalised.
- Contact lenses of suitable power have been tried but are not in common use.

== See also ==
- Underwater vision – Ability to see objects underwater
- Human factors in diving equipment design – Influence of the interaction between the user and the equipment on design
