= ISO 1000 =

Withdrawn ISO standard

International standard ISO 1000 (SI units and recommendations for the use of their multiples and of certain other units, International Organization for Standardization, 1992) is the ISO standard describing the International System of Units (SI).

The ISO 1000:1992 standard was withdrawn in 2009 together with ISO 31, and are superseded by ISO/IEC 80000.

== See also ==
- BIPM – publishes freely available information on SI units
- SI
