= Taiwan Accreditation Foundation =

Organization based in Tamsui, Taipei, Taiwan

- 財團法人全國認證基金會
- Abbreviation: TAF
- Predecessor: Chinese National Laboratory Accreditation, Chinese National Accreditation Board
- Formation: 17 September 2003
- Founder: Ministry of Economic Affairs
- Legal status: Company
- Headquarters: Tamsui, Taipei, Taiwan
- Website: Official website

The Taiwan Accreditation Foundation (TAF; traditional Chinese: 財團法人全國認證基金會; simplified Chinese: 财团法人全国认证基金会; pinyin: Cáituán Fǎrén Quánguó Rènzhèng Jījīn Huì) is an organization based in Tamsui District, Taipei, Taiwan which provides third party accreditation services in compliance with international standards.

== History ==
The organization was established by the Ministry of Economic Affairs on 17 September 2003 by merging the Chinese National Laboratory Accreditation and the Chinese National Accreditation Board.

== Organizational structures ==
- Department of Administration
- Department of Certification Body Accreditation
- Laboratory Accreditation Department I
- Laboratory Accreditation Department II

== Branch office ==
- Hsinchu City

== See also ==
- National Standards of the Republic of China
