= ISO 31 =

Superseded standard on quantities and units

ISO 31 (Quantities and units, International Organization for Standardization, 1992) is a superseded international standard concerning physical quantities, units of measurement, their interrelationships and their presentation. It was revised and replaced by ISO/IEC 80000.

== Parts ==
The standard comes in 14 parts:

- ISO 31-0: General principles
- ISO 31-1: Space and time
- ISO 31-2: Periodic and related phenomena
- ISO 31-3: Mechanics
- ISO 31-4: Heat
- ISO 31-5: Electricity and magnetism
- ISO 31-6: Light and related electromagnetic radiations
- ISO 31-7: Acoustics
- ISO 31-8: Physical chemistry and molecular physics
- ISO 31-9: Atomic and nuclear physics
- ISO 31-10: Nuclear reactions and ionizing radiations
- ISO 31-11: Mathematical signs and symbols for use in the physical sciences and technology
- ISO 31-12: Characteristic numbers
- ISO 31-13: Solid state physics

=== Coined words ===
ISO 31-0 introduced several new words into the English language that are direct spelling-calques from the French. Some of these words have been used in scientific literature.

New phrase	Existing phrase	Technical meaning
massic <quantity>	specific <quantity>	a quantity divided by its associated mass
volumic <quantity>	[volumic] <quantity> density	a quantity divided by its associated volume
areic <quantity>	surface <quantity> density	a quantity divided by its associated area
lineic <quantity>	linear <quantity> density	a quantity divided by its associated length

== Content ==
=== ISO 31-0 ===
ISO 31-0 is the introductory part of international standard ISO 31 on quantities and units. It provides guidelines for using physical quantities, quantity and unit symbols, and coherent unit systems, especially the SI. It was intended for use in all fields of science and technology and is augmented by more specialized conventions defined in other parts of the ISO 31 standard. ISO 31-0 was withdrawn on 17 November 2009. It is superseded by ISO 80000-1. Other parts of ISO 31 have also been withdrawn and replaced by parts of ISO 80000.

=== ISO 31-1 ===
Its definitions include:

Quantity		Unit			Remarks
Name	Symbol	Name	Symbol	Definition	Remarks
angle, (plane angle)	α, β, γ, θ, φ	radian	rad	1 rad = 1 m/m = 1	
angle, (plane angle)	α, β, γ, θ, φ	degree	°	1° = π/180 rad	There is no space between the number and these superscript-style unit symbols. Decimal subdivision of degrees is preferable (i.e., 12.5° instead of 12°30′)
angle, (plane angle)	α, β, γ, θ, φ	minute	′	1′ = (1/60)°	There is no space between the number and these superscript-style unit symbols. Decimal subdivision of degrees is preferable (i.e., 12.5° instead of 12°30′)
angle, (plane angle)	α, β, γ, θ, φ	second	″	1″ = (1/60)′	There is no space between the number and these superscript-style unit symbols. Decimal subdivision of degrees is preferable (i.e., 12.5° instead of 12°30′)
solid angle	Ω	steradian	sr	1 sr = 1 m^{2}/m^{2} = 1	
length	l, L	metre	m	The metre is the length of the path travelled by light in vacuum during a time interval of 1/(299 792 458) of a second; see speed of light	
breadth	b	metre	m	The metre is the length of the path travelled by light in vacuum during a time interval of 1/(299 792 458) of a second; see speed of light	
height	h	metre	m	The metre is the length of the path travelled by light in vacuum during a time interval of 1/(299 792 458) of a second; see speed of light	
thickness	d, δ	metre	m	The metre is the length of the path travelled by light in vacuum during a time interval of 1/(299 792 458) of a second; see speed of light	
radius	r, R	metre	m	The metre is the length of the path travelled by light in vacuum during a time interval of 1/(299 792 458) of a second; see speed of light	
diameter	d, D	metre	m	The metre is the length of the path travelled by light in vacuum during a time interval of 1/(299 792 458) of a second; see speed of light	
length of path, (linear) displacement vector	s, **s**	metre	m	The metre is the length of the path travelled by light in vacuum during a time interval of 1/(299 792 458) of a second; see speed of light	
distance	d, r	metre	m	The metre is the length of the path travelled by light in vacuum during a time interval of 1/(299 792 458) of a second; see speed of light	
cartesian coordinates	x, y, z	metre	m	The metre is the length of the path travelled by light in vacuum during a time interval of 1/(299 792 458) of a second; see speed of light	
radius of curvature	ϱ	metre	m	The metre is the length of the path travelled by light in vacuum during a time interval of 1/(299 792 458) of a second; see speed of light	
curvature	ϰ	reciprocal metre	m^{−1}		
area	A	square metre	m^{2}		The units are (1 a = 100 m^{2}) and hectare (1 ha = 100 a) are used for agrarian areas.
volume	V	cubic metre	m^{3}		
volume	V	litre	L, l	1 L = 1 dm^{3}	The capital L is preferred as the small l can be indistinguishable from the number 1 in some fonts.
time, time interval, duration	t	second	s	The second is the duration of 9 192 631 770 periods of the radiation corresponding to the transition between the two hyperfine levels of the ground state of the caesium-133 atom	Representations of time of day are defined in ISO 8601.
time, time interval, duration	t	minute	min	1 min = 60 s	Representations of time of day are defined in ISO 8601.
time, time interval, duration	t	hour	h	1 h = 60 min = 3 600 s	Representations of time of day are defined in ISO 8601.
time, time interval, duration	t	day	d	1 d = 24 h = 1 440 min = 86 400 s	Representations of time of day are defined in ISO 8601.
angular velocity	ω	radian per second	rad/s		ω=dφ/dt
angular acceleration	α	radian per second squared	rad/s^{2}		α=dω/dt
velocity	v (general symbol), **v** (velocity vector), c (propagation speed of waves), u, v, w (components of a velocity c)	metre per second	m/s		
velocity	v (general symbol), **v** (velocity vector), c (propagation speed of waves), u, v, w (components of a velocity c)	kilometre per hour	km/h		
acceleration, acceleration vector	a, **a**	metre per second squared	m/s^{2}	1 g = 9.80665 m/s^{2}	
acceleration of free fall, acceleration due to gravity	g	metre per second squared	m/s^{2}	1 g = 9.80665 m/s^{2}	

It includes two annexes:

- Annex A of ISO 31-1 lists units of space and time based on the foot, pound, and second.
- Annex B lists some other non-SI units of space and time, namely the gon, light year, astronomical unit, parsec, tropical year, and gal.

=== ISO 31-3 ===
Its definitions include (note boldfaced symbols mean quantity is a vector):

Quantity		Unit			Remarks
Name	Symbol	Name	Symbol	Definition	Remarks
Force	**F**	newton	N	1 N = 1 kg·m/s^{2}	Unit named after Isaac Newton
Moment of force, Torque	**M**, $\boldsymbol{\tau}$		N·m	1 N·m = 1 kg·m^{2}/s^{2}	The unit is dimensionally equivalent to the units of energy, the joule; but the joule should not be used as an alternative for the newton metre.
Linear momentum	**p**		kg·m/s or N·s		
(Linear) impulse	**J**		N·s or kg·m/s		
Angular momentum	**L**		kg·m^{2}/s or N·m·s		
Mechanical energy, Work	E, W	joule	J	1 J = 1 kg·m^{2}/s^{2} = 1 Pa·m^{3} = 1 W·s	Unit named after James Joule. The joule is dimensionally equivalent to the units of torque and moment of force but should be used in preference to the newton metre (N·m).
Power	P	watt	W	1 W = 1 J/s = 1 N·m/s = 1 kg·m^{2}/s^{3}	Unit named after James Watt.
Pressure	p	pascal	Pa	1 Pa = 1 N / m^{2} = 1 kg/(m·s^{2})	Named after Blaise Pascal.
Normal stress, Shear stress	$\sigma, \tau$	pascal	Pa	1 Pa = 1 N / m^{2} = 1 kg/(m·s^{2})	Named after Blaise Pascal.

=== ISO 31-4 ===
Its definitions include:

Quantity		Unit			Remarks
Name	Symbol	Name	Symbol	Definition	Remarks
thermodynamic temperature	T, (Θ)	kelvin	K	The kelvin is the fraction 1/273.16 of the thermodynamic temperature of the triple point of water.	For practical measurements, the International Temperature Scale of 1990 defines several fixed points and interpolation procedures.
Celsius temperature	t, φ	degree Celsius	°C	The degree Celsius is a special name for the unit kelvin, for use in stating values of Celsius temperature.	t = T − T_{0}, where T_{0} = 273.15 K
linear expansion coefficient	α_{l}	reciprocal kelvin, kelvin to the power negative 1	K^{−1}		$\alpha_l=\frac 1l\frac lT$

Annex A of ISO 31-4 lists units of heat based on the foot, pound and second and some other units, including the degree Rankine, degree Fahrenheit, British thermal unit and others. Annex B lists conversion factors for three versions of the calorie.

=== ISO 31-5 ===
Some of its definitions are below, with values taken from NIST values of the constants:

Name	Symbol	Definition	Value
Speed of light in vacuum	c_{0}	299 792 458 m s^{−1}	299 792 458 m s^{−1}
Magnetic constant	μ_{0}	4π × 10^{−7} N A^{−2}	12.566 370 614... × 10^{−7} N A^{−2}
Electric constant	ε_{0}	$$\begin{matrix}\frac {1} {\mu_0 {c_0}^2}\end{matrix}$$	8.854 187 817... × 10^{−12} F m^{−1}
Characteristic impedance of vacuum	Z_{0}	μ_{0} c_{0}	376.730 313 461...Ω

=== ISO 31-6 ===
The definitions of ISO 31-6, as defined in 1980, included:

Quantity		Unit			Remarks
Name	Symbol	Name	Symbol	Definition	Remarks
frequency	f, v	hertz	Hz	1 Hz = 1 s^{−1}	
circular frequency	ω	reciprocal second, second to the power of minus one	s^{−1}		
circular frequency	ω	radian per second	rad/s		
wavelength	λ	metre	m		
wavelength	λ	ångström	Å	1 Å = 10^{−10} m	10 Å = 1 nm
wavenumber, repetency	σ	reciprocal metre, metre to the power of minus one	m^{−1}		The multiple cm^{−1} is often used.
circular wavenumber, circular repetency	k	reciprocal metre, metre to the power of minus one	m^{−1}		The multiple cm^{−1} is often used.
velocity (speed) of propagation of electromagnetic waves in vacuo	c, c_{0}	metre per second	m/s		c = (2.99792458 ± 0.000000012) × 10^{8} m/s. (Note: This is the text of the note in the standard ISO 31-6 as published in 1980. At the time, the metre was not defined in terms of the speed of light. Today, the speed of light is defined as exactly 299,792,458 m/s.); Sometimes c is used for the phase velocity in a medium, in which case c_{0} is used for the velocity in vacuo.
radiant energy	Q, W, (U, Q_{e})	joule	J	1 J = 1 kg·m^{2}/s^{2}	
radiant energy density	w, (u)	joule per cubic metre	J/m^{3}		
spectral concentration of radiant energy density (in terms of wavelength), spectral radiant energy density (in terms of wavelength)	w_{λ}	joule per metre to the fourth power	J/m^{4}		
radiant power, radiant energy flux	P, Φ, (Φ_{e})	watt	W	1 W = 1 J/s	
radiant energy fluence rate	φ, ψ	watt per square metre	W/m^{2}		
radiant intensity	I, (I_{e})	watt per steradian	W/sr		

=== ISO 31-7 ===
Its definitions include:

Quantity			Unit		Remarks
Name	Symbol	Definition	Name	Symbol	Remarks
period, periodic time	T	time of one cycle	second	s	
frequency	f, ν	f = 1/T	hertz	Hz	1 Hz = 1 s^{−1}
loudness level	L_{N}	L_{N} = ln(p_{eff}/p_{0})_{1 kHz} where p_{eff} is the root-mean-square value of the sound pressure of a pure tone of 1 kHz, which is judged by a normal observer under standardized listening conditions as being as loud as the sound under investigation, and where p_{0} = 20 μPa	phon		The loudness level is 1 phon if 20 log_{10}(p_{eff}/p_{0})_{1 kHz}=1, that is for a pure tone of frequency 1 kHz, 1 phon = 1 dB sound pressure level. This is not a purely physical quantity and unit, as it involves the subjective evaluation by humans.
loudness	N	A normal observer's auditory estimate of the ratio between the strength of the sound considered and that of a reference sound having a loudness level of 40 phons	sone		A standard relation between loudness in sones and loudness level in phons has been adopted for practical use in ISO 131.

=== ISO 31-8 ===
Its definitions include:

Quantity			Unit		Remarks
Name	Symbol	Definition	Name	Symbol	Remarks
relative atomic mass	A_{r}	Ratio of the average mass per atom of an element to 1/12 of the mass of an atom of the nuclide ^{12}C	one	1	Formerly called atomic/molecular weight. Example: A_{r}(Cl) = 35.453. Both quantities depend on the nuclidic composition.
relative molecular mass	M_{r}	Ratio of the average mass per molecule or specified entity of a substance to 1/12 of the mass of an atom of the nuclide ^{12}C	one	1	Formerly called atomic/molecular weight. Example: A_{r}(Cl) = 35.453. Both quantities depend on the nuclidic composition.
number of molecules or other elementary entities	N	Number of molecules or other elementary entities in a system	one	1	
amount of substance	n, (ν)		mole	mol	The mole is the amount of substance of a system which contains as many elementary entities as there are atoms in 0.012 kg of ^{12}C. When the mole is used, the elementary entities must be specified and may be atoms, molecules, ions, electrons, other particles, or specific groups of such particles. The definition applies to unbound atoms of ^{12}C, at rest and in their ground state.

Note: In the tables of quantities and their units, the ISO 31-8 standard shows symbols for substances as subscripts (e.g., c_{B}, w_{B}, p_{B}). It also notes that it is generally advisable to put symbols for substances and their states in parentheses on the same line, as in c(H_{2}SO_{4}).

It includes three normative annexes.

Annex A
Names and symbols of the chemical elements

This annex contains a list of elements by atomic number, giving the names and standard symbols of the chemical elements from atomic number 1 (hydrogen, H) to 109 (unnilennium, Une).

The list given in ISO 31-8:1992 was quoted from the 1998 IUPAC "Green Book" Quantities, Units and Symbols in Physical Chemistry and adds in some cases in parentheses the Latin name for information, where the standard symbol has no relation to the English name of the element. Since the 1992 edition of the standard was published, some elements with atomic number above 103 have been discovered and renamed.

Annex B
Symbols for chemical elements and nucleides

Symbols for chemical elements shall be written in roman (upright) type. The symbol is not followed by a full-stop.

Examples:

H He C Ca

Attached subscripts or superscripts specifying a nucleotide or molecule have the following meanings and positions:

- The nucleon number (mass number) is shown in the left superscript position (e.g., ^{14}N)
- The number of atoms of a nucleotide is shown in the right subscript position (e.g., ^{14}N_{2})
- The proton number (atomic number) may be indicated in the left subscript position (e.g., _{64}Gd)
- If necessary, a state of ionization or an excited state may be indicated in the right superscript position (e.g., state of ionization Na^{+})

Annex C (pH)

pH is defined operationally as follows. For a solution X, first measure the electromotive force E_{X} of the galvanic cell

reference electrode | concentrated solution of KCl | solution X | H_{2} | Pt

and then also measure the electromotive force E_{S} of a galvanic cell that differs from the above one only by the replacement of the solution X of unknown pH, pH(X), by a solution S of a known standard pH, pH(S). Then obtain the pH of X as

pH(X) = pH(S) + (E_{S} − E_{X}) F / (RT ln 10)

where

F is the Faraday constant;
R is the molar gas constant;
T is the thermodynamic temperature.

Defined this way, pH is a quantity of dimension 1, that is it has no unit. Values pH(S) for a range of standard solutions S are listed in Definitions of pH scales, standard reference values, measurement of pH, and related terminology. Pure Appl. Chem. (1985), 57, pp 531–542, where further details can be found.

pH has no fundamental meaning; its official definition is a practical one. However, in the restricted range of dilute aqueous solutions having amount-of-substance concentrations less than 0.1 mol/L, and being neither strongly alkaline nor strongly acidic (2 < pH < 12), the definition is such that

pH = −log_{10}[c(H^{+}) y_{1} / (1 mol/L)] ± 0.02

where c(H^{+}) denotes the amount-of-substance concentration of hydrogen ion H^{+} and y_{1} denotes the activity coefficient of a typical uni-univalent electrolyte in the solution.

=== ISO 31-10 ===
Its definitions include:

Quantity			Unit			Remarks
Name	Symbol	Definition	Name	Symbol	Definition	Remarks
activity	A	Expectation value of the number of spontaneous nuclear transitions from a particular energy state occurring in an amount of radionuclide in a small time interval, divided by that time interval	becquerel	Bq	1 Bq = 1/s	The becquerel is a special name for second to the power minus one, to be used as the SI unit of activity. curie: 1 Ci = 3.7×10^{10} Bq (exactly)
absorbed dose	D	For any ionizing radiation, the mean energy imparted to an element of irradiated matter divided by the mass of this element	gray	Gy	1 Gy = 1 J/kg	The gray is a special name for joule per kilogram, to be used as the SI unit for absorbed dose. rad: 1 rad = 0.01 Gy
dose equivalent	H	Product of D, Q and N, at the point of interest in tissue, where D is the absorbed dose, Q is the quality factor and N is the product of any other modifying factors H = D · Q · N For Q and N, see CIPM, 1984, Recommendation 1 and ICRU Report 33 (1980)	sievert	Sv	1 Sv = 1 J/kg	The sievert is a special name for joule per kilogram, to be used as the SI unit for dose equivalent. rem: 1 rem = 0.01 Sv

=== ISO 31-11 ===
It included definitions for symbols for mathematical logic, set theory, arithmetic and complex numbers, functions and special functions and values, matrices, vectors, and tensors, coordinate systems, and miscellaneous mathematical relations.

== Related national standards ==
- Canada: CAN/CSA-Z234-1-89 Canadian Metric Practice Guide (covers some aspects of ISO 31-0, but is not a comprehensive list of physical quantities comparable to ISO 31)
- United States: There are several national SI guidance documents, such as NIST SP 811, NIST SP 330, NIST SP 814, IEEE/ASTM SI 10, SAE J916. These cover many aspects of the ISO 31-0 standard, but lack the comprehensive list of quantities and units defined in the remaining parts of ISO 31.

== Replacement ==
A second international standard on quantities and units is IEC 60027. The ISO 31 and IEC 60027 standards were revised by the two organizations in collaboration to integrate both standards into a joint standard ISO/IEC 80000 ISO/IEC 80000 - Quantities and Units, in which the quantities and equations used with SI are to be referred as the International System of Quantities (ISQ). ISO/IEC 80000 supersedes both ISO 31 (and part of IEC 60027), as follows:

- ISO 31-0: General principles (replaced by ISO/IEC 80000-1:2009)
- ISO 31-1: Space and time (replaced by ISO/IEC 80000-3:2007)
- ISO 31-2: Periodic and related phenomena (replaced by ISO/IEC 80000-3:2007)
- ISO 31-3: Mechanics (replaced by ISO/IEC 80000-4:2006)
- ISO 31-4: Heat (replaced by ISO/IEC 80000-5)
- ISO 31-5: Electricity and magnetism (replaced by ISO/IEC 80000-6)
- ISO 31-6: Light and related electromagnetic radiations (replaced by ISO/IEC 80000-7)
- ISO 31-7: Acoustics (replaced by ISO/IEC 80000-8:2007)
- ISO 31-8: Physical chemistry and molecular physics (replaced by ISO/IEC 80000-9)
- ISO 31-9: Atomic and nuclear physics (replaced by ISO/IEC 80000-10)
- ISO 31-10: Nuclear reactions and ionizing radiations (replaced by ISO/IEC 80000-10)
- ISO 31-11: Mathematical signs and symbols for use in the physical sciences and technology (replaced by ISO 80000-2:2009)
- ISO 31-12: Characteristic numbers (replaced by ISO/IEC 80000-11)
- ISO 31-13: Solid state physics (replaced by ISO/IEC 80000-12)

== See also ==
- SI – the international system of units
- BIPM – publishes freely available information on SI units , which overlaps with some of the material covered in ISO 31-0
- IUPAP – much of the material in ISO 31 comes originally from Document IUPAP-25 of the Commission for Symbols, Units and Nomenclature (SUN Commission) of the International Union of Pure and Applied Physics
- IUPAC – some of the material in ISO 31 originates from the Interdivisional Committee on Terminology, Nomenclature and Symbols of the International Union of Pure and Applied Chemistry
- Quantities, Units and Symbols in Physical Chemistry – this IUPAC "Green Book" covers many ISO 31 definitions
- IEC 60027 Letter symbols to be used in electrical technology
- ISO 1000 SI Units and Recommendations for the use of their multiples and of certain other units (bundled with ISO 31 as the ISO Standards Handbook – Quantities and units)
