= ISO/IEC 80000 =

International standard on physical quantities and units of measurement

ISO/IEC 80000, Quantities and units, is an international standard describing the International System of Quantities (ISQ). It was developed and promulgated jointly by the International Organization for Standardization (ISO) and the International Electrotechnical Commission (IEC). It serves as a style guide for using physical quantities and units of measurement, formulas involving them, and their corresponding units, in scientific and educational documents for worldwide use. The ISO/IEC 80000 family of standards was completed with the publication of the first edition of Part 1 in November 2009.

== Overview ==
By 2021, ISO/IEC 80000 comprised 13 parts, two of which (parts 6 and 13) were developed by IEC and the remaining 11 were developed by ISO, with a further three parts (15, 16 and, 17) under development. Part 14 was withdrawn.

Part	Year	Name	Replaces	Status
ISO 80000-1	2022	General	ISO 31-0, IEC 60027-1, and IEC 60027-3	published
ISO 80000-2	2019	Mathematics	ISO 31-11 and IEC 60027-1	published
ISO 80000-3	2019	Space and time	ISO 31-1 and ISO 31-2	published
ISO 80000-4	2019	Mechanics	ISO 31-3	published
ISO 80000-5	2019	Thermodynamics	ISO 31-4	published
IEC 80000-6	2022	Electromagnetism	ISO 31-5	published
ISO 80000-7	2019	Light and radiation	ISO 31-6	published
ISO 80000-8	2020	Acoustics	ISO 31-7	published
ISO 80000-9	2019	Physical chemistry and molecular physics	ISO 31-8	published
ISO 80000-10	2019	Atomic and nuclear physics	ISO 31-9 and ISO 31-10	published
ISO 80000-11	2019	Characteristic numbers	ISO 31-12	published
ISO 80000-12	2019	Condensed matter physics	ISO 31-13	published
IEC 80000-13	2025	Information science and technology	subclauses 3.8 and 3.9 of IEC 60027-2:2005	published
IEC 80000-14	2008	Telebiometrics related to human physiology	IEC 60027-7	withdrawn
IEC 80000-15		Logarithmic and related quantities		under development
IEC 80000-16		Printing and writing rules		under development
IEC 80000-17		Time dependency		under development

== Subject areas ==
By 2021 the 80000 standard had 13 published parts. A description of each part is available online, with the complete parts for sale.

=== Part 1: General ===
ISO 80000-1:2022 revised ISO 80000-1:2009, which replaced ISO 31-0:1992 and ISO 1000:1992. This document gives general information and definitions concerning quantities, systems of quantities, units, quantity and unit symbols, and coherent unit systems, especially the International System of Quantities (ISQ). The descriptive text of this part is available online.

According to the standard, symbols for quantities are "generally single letters from the Latin or Greek alphabet" and are "written in italic (sloping) type". Examples include

- density of heat flow rate: q = Φ / A
- electric current density: J = I / A
- magnetic flux density: B = Φ / A

=== Part 2: Mathematics ===
ISO 80000-2:2019 revised ISO 80000-2:2009, which superseded ISO 31-11. It specifies mathematical symbols, explains their meanings, and gives verbal equivalents and applications. The descriptive text of this part is available online.

=== Part 3: Space and time ===
ISO 80000-3:2019 revised ISO 80000-3:2006, which supersedes ISO 31-1 and ISO 31-2. It gives names, symbols, definitions and units for quantities of space and time. The descriptive text of this part is available online.

A definition of the decibel, included in the original 2006 publication, was omitted in the 2019 revision, leaving ISO/IEC 80000 without a definition of this unit; a new part of the standard, IEC 80000-15 (Logarithmic and related quantities), is under development.

=== Part 4: Mechanics ===
ISO 80000-4:2019 revised ISO 80000-4:2006, which superseded ISO 31-3. It gives names, symbols, definitions and units for quantities of mechanics. The descriptive text of this part is available online.

=== Part 5: Thermodynamics ===
ISO 80000-5:2019 revised ISO 80000-5:2007, which superseded ISO 31-4. It gives names, symbols, definitions and units for quantities of thermodynamics. The descriptive text of this part is available online.

=== Part 6: Electromagnetism ===
IEC 80000-6:2022 revised IEC 80000-6:2008, which superseded ISO 31-5 as well as IEC 60027-1. It gives names, symbols, and definitions for quantities and units of electromagnetism. The descriptive text of this part is available online.

=== Part 7: Light and radiation ===
ISO 80000-7:2019 revised ISO 80000-7:2008, which superseded ISO 31-6. It gives names, symbols, definitions and units for quantities used for light and optical radiation in the wavelength range of approximately 1 nm to 1 mm. The descriptive text of this part is available online.

=== Part 8: Acoustics ===
ISO 80000-8:2020 revised ISO 80000-8:2007, which revised ISO 31-7:1992. It gives names, symbols, definitions, and units for quantities of acoustics. The descriptive text of this part is available online.

It has a foreword, scope introduction, scope, normative references (of which there are none), as well as terms, and definitions. It includes definitions of sound pressure, sound power, and sound exposure, and their corresponding levels: sound pressure level, sound power level, and sound exposure level. It includes definitions of the following quantities:

- logarithmic frequency range
- static pressure
- sound pressure
- sound particle displacement
- sound particle velocity
- sound particle acceleration
- volume flow rate, volume velocity
- sound energy density
- sound energy
- sound power
- sound intensity
- sound exposure
- characteristic impedance for longitudinal waves
- acoustic impedance
- sound pressure level
- sound power level
- sound exposure level
- reverberation time

=== Part 13: Information science and technology ===
IEC 80000-13:2025 revised IEC 80000-13:2008, which replaced subclauses 3.8 and 3.9 of IEC 60027-2:2005 and IEC 60027-3. It defines quantities and units used in information science and information technology, and specifies names and symbols for these quantities and units. It has a scope; normative references; names, definitions, and symbols; and prefixes for binary multiples.

Quantities defined in this standard are:

- traffic intensity, A: "number of simultaneously busy resources in a particular pool of resources"
- traffic offered intensity, A_{0}: "traffic intensity ... of the traffic that would have been generated by the users of a pool of resources if their use had not been limited by the size of the pool"
- traffic carried intensity, Y: "traffic intensity ... of the traffic served by a particular pool of resources"
- mean queue length, L (or Ω): time average of queue length
- loss probability, B: "probability for losing a call attempt"
- waiting probability, W: "probability for waiting for a resource"
- call intensity, calling rate, λ: "number of call attempts over a specified time interval divided by the duration of this interval"
- completed call intensity, μ: "call intensity ... for the call attempts that result in the transmission of an answer signal"
- storage capacity, storage size, M
- equivalent binary storage capacity, M_{e}
- transfer rate, r (or ν)
- period of data elements, T
- binary digit rate, bit rate, r_{b}, r_{bit} (ν_{b}, ν_{bit})
- period of binary digits, bit period, T_{b}, T_{bit}
- equivalent binary digit rate, equivalent bit rate, r_{e} (or ν_{e})
- modulation rate, line digit rate, r_{m}, u
- quantizing distortion power, T_{Q}
- carrier power, P_{c}, C
- signal energy per binary digit, E_{b}, E_{bit}
- error probability, P
- Hamming distance, d_{n}
- clock frequency, clock rate, f_{cl}
- decision content, D_{a}
- information content, I(x)
- entropy, H
- maximum entropy, H_{0} (or H_{max})
- relative entropy, H_{r}
- redundancy, R
- relative redundancy, r
- joint information content, I(x, y)
- conditional information content, I(x|y)
- conditional entropy, mean conditional information content, average conditional information content, H(X|Y)
- equivocation, H(X|Y)
- irrelevance, C
- transinformation content, T(x, y)
- mean transinformation content, T
- character mean entropy, H′
- average information rate, H*
- character mean transinformation content, T′
- average transinformation rate, T*
- channel capacity per character; channel capacity, C′
- channel time capacity; channel capacity, C*

The standard also includes definitions for units relating to information technology, such as the erlang (E), bit (bit), octet (o), byte (B), baud (Bd), shannon (Sh), hartley (Hart), and the natural unit of information (nat).

Clause 4 of the standard defines standard binary prefixes used to denote powers of 1024 as 1024^{1} (kibi-), 1024^{2} (mebi-), 1024^{3} (gibi-), 1024^{4} (tebi-), 1024^{5} (pebi-), 1024^{6} (exbi-), 1024^{7} (zebi-), 1024^{8} (yobi-), 1024^{9} (robi-), and 1024^{10} (quebi-).

== International System of Quantities ==
Part 1 of ISO 80000 introduces the International System of Quantities and describes its relationship with the International System of Units (SI). Specifically, its introduction states "The system of quantities, including the relations among the quantities used as the basis of the units of the SI, is named the International System of Quantities, denoted 'ISQ', in all languages." It further clarifies that "ISQ is simply a convenient notation to assign to the essentially infinite and continually evolving and expanding system of quantities and equations on which all of modern science and technology rests. ISQ is a shorthand notation for the 'system of quantities on which the SI is based'."

== Units of the ISO and IEC 80000 series ==
The standard includes all SI units but is not limited to only SI units. Units that form part of the standard but not the SI include the units of information storage (bit and byte), units of entropy (shannon, natural unit of information and hartley), and the erlang (a unit of traffic intensity).

== See also ==
- International Vocabulary of Metrology
- International System of Units
- BIPM – publishes freely available information on SI units
- NIST – official U.S. representative for SI; publishes freely available guide to use of SI
