= Per meg =

Unit in isotope analysis

The phrase per meg indicates a fraction equal to 0.001 permil, or 0.0001 percent, or 1 part per million (ppm). It is typically used as a unit in isotope analysis, where multiplying an isotope ratio in delta annotation, for example δ^{18}O, by 1000000 yields a value in per meg. This notation is most frequently used in studies of atmospheric trace gases, where a high precision is needed for interpretation of the results.
