= Relative change =

Comparisons in quantitative sciences

In any quantitative science, the terms relative change and relative difference are used to compare two quantities while taking into account the "sizes" of the things being compared, i.e. dividing by a standard or reference or starting value. The comparison is expressed as a ratio and is a unitless number. By multiplying these ratios by 100 they can be expressed as percentages so the terms percentage change, percent(age) difference, or relative percentage difference are also commonly used. The terms "change" and "difference" are used interchangeably.

Relative change is often used as a quantitative indicator of quality assurance and quality control for repeated measurements where the outcomes are expected to be the same. A special case of percent change (relative change expressed as a percentage) called percent error occurs in measuring situations where the reference value is the accepted or actual value (perhaps theoretically determined) and the value being compared to it is experimentally determined (by measurement).

The relative change formula is not well-behaved under many conditions. Various alternative formulas, called indicators of relative change, have been proposed in the literature. Several authors have found log change and log points to be satisfactory indicators, but these have not seen widespread use.

== Definition ==
Given two numerical quantities, v_{ref} and v with v_{ref} some reference value, their actual change, actual difference, or absolute change is
$$\Delta v = v - v_\mathrm{ref}.$$
The term absolute difference is sometimes also used even though the absolute value is not taken; the sign of Δ typically is uniform, e.g. across an increasing data series. If the relationship of the value with respect to the reference value (that is, larger or smaller) does not matter in a particular application, the absolute value may be used in place of the actual change in the above formula to produce a value for the relative change which is always non-negative. The actual difference is not usually a good way to compare the numbers, in particular because it depends on the unit of measurement. For instance, 1 m is the same as 100 cm, but the absolute difference between 2 and 1 m is 1 while the absolute difference between 200 and 100 cm is 100, giving the impression of a larger difference. But even with constant units, the relative change helps judge the importance of the respective change. For example, an increase in price of $100 of a valuable is considered big if changing from $50 to 150 but rather small when changing from $10,000 to 10,100.

We can adjust the comparison to take into account the "size" of the quantities involved, by defining, for positive values of v_{ref}:
$$\text{relative change}(v_\mathrm{ref}, v) = \frac{\text{actual change}}{\text{reference value}} = \frac{\Delta v}{v_\mathrm{ref}} = \frac{v}{v_\mathrm{ref}} - 1.$$

The relative change is independent of the unit of measurement employed; for example, the relative change from 2 to 1 m is −50%, the same as for 200 to 100 cm. The relative change is not defined if the reference value (v_{ref}) is zero, and gives negative values for positive increases if v_{ref} is negative, hence it is not usually defined for negative reference values either. For example, we might want to calculate the relative change of −10 to −6. The above formula gives ((−6) − (−10))/( −10) = 4/( −10) = −0.4, indicating a decrease, yet in fact the reading increased.

Measures of relative change are unitless numbers expressed as a fraction. Corresponding values of percent change would be obtained by multiplying these values by 100 (and appending the % sign to indicate that the value is a percentage).

== Domain ==
The domain restriction of relative change to positive numbers often poses a constraint. To avoid this problem it is common to take the absolute value, so that the relative change formula works correctly for all nonzero values of $v_\mathrm{ref}$:
$$\text{Relative change}(v_\mathrm{ref}, v)  = \frac{v - v_\mathrm{ref}}{|v_\mathrm{ref}|}.$$

This still does not solve the issue when the reference is zero. It is common to instead use an indicator of relative change, and take the absolute values of both $v$ and $v_\mathrm{ref}$. Then the only problematic case is $v = v_\mathrm{ref} = 0$, which can usually be addressed by appropriately extending the indicator. For example, for arithmetic mean this formula may be used:
$$d_r(x,y)=\frac{|x-y|}{(|x|+|y|)/2},\ d_r(0,0)=0 .$$

== Percentage change ==
A percentage change is a way to express a change in a variable. It represents the relative change between the old value and the new one.

For example, if a house is worth $100,000 today and the year after its value goes up to $110,000, the percentage change of its value can be expressed as
$$\frac{110,000-100,000}{100,000} = 0.1 = 10\%.$$
It can then be said that the worth of the house went up by 10%.

More generally, if $V_1$ represents the old value and $V_2$ the new value,
$$\text{Percentage change} = \frac{\Delta V}{V_1} = \frac{V_2 - V_1}{V_1} \times100\% .$$

Some calculators directly support this via a %CH or Δ% function.

When the variable in question is a percentage itself, it is better to talk about its change by using percentage points, to avoid confusion between relative difference and absolute difference.

=== Percent error ===
The percent error is a special case of the percentage form of relative change calculated from the absolute change between the experimental (measured) and theoretical (accepted) values, and dividing by the theoretical (accepted) value.
$$\%\text{ Error} = \frac{|\text{Experimental}-\text{Theoretical}|}{|\text{Theoretical}|}\times 100.$$

The terms "Experimental" and "Theoretical" used in the equation above are commonly replaced with similar terms. Other terms used for experimental could be "measured", "calculated", or "actual" and another term used for theoretical could be "accepted". Experimental value is what has been derived by use of calculation and/or measurement and is having its accuracy tested against the theoretical value, a value that is accepted by the scientific community or a value that could be seen as a goal for a successful result.

Although it is common practice to use the absolute value version of relative change when discussing percent error, in some situations, it can be beneficial to remove the absolute values to provide more information about the result. Thus, if an experimental value is less than the theoretical value, the percent error will be negative. This negative result provides additional information about the experimental result. For example, experimentally calculating the speed of light and coming up with a negative percent error says that the experimental value is a velocity that is less than the speed of light. This is a big difference from getting a positive percent error, which means the experimental value is a velocity that is greater than the speed of light (violating the theory of relativity) and is a newsworthy result.

The percent error equation, when rewritten by removing the absolute values, becomes:
$$\%\text{ Error} = \frac{\text{Experimental}-\text{Theoretical}}{|\text{Theoretical}|}\times100.$$

The two values in the numerator do not commute. It is vital to preserve the order as above: subtract the theoretical value from the experimental value and not vice versa.

== Examples ==
=== Valuable assets ===
Suppose that car M costs $50,000 and car L costs $40,000. We wish to compare these costs. With respect to car L, the absolute difference is $10,000 = $50,000 − $40,000. That is, car M costs $10,000 more than car L. The relative difference is,
$$\frac{\$10,000}{\$40,000} = 0.25 = 25\%,$$
and we say that car M costs 25% more than car L. It is also common to express the comparison as a ratio, which in this example is,
$$\frac{\$50,000}{\$40,000} = 1.25 = 125\%,$$
and we say that car M costs 125% of the cost of car L.

In this example the cost of car L was considered the reference value, but we could have made the choice the other way and considered the cost of car M as the reference value. The absolute difference is now −$10,000 = $40,000 − $50,000 since car L costs $10,000 less than car M. The relative difference,
$$\frac{-\$10,000}{\$50,000} = -0.20 = -20\%$$
is also negative since car L costs 20% less than car M. The ratio form of the comparison,
$$\frac{\$40,000}{\$50,000} = 0.8 = 80\%$$
says that car L costs 80% of what car M costs.

It is the use of the words "of" and "less/more than" that distinguish between ratios and relative differences.

=== Percentages of percentages ===
If a bank were to raise the interest rate on a savings account from 3% to 4%, the statement that "the interest rate was increased by 1%" would be incorrect and misleading. The absolute change in this situation is 1 percentage point (4% − 3%), but the relative change in the interest rate is:
$$\frac{4\% - 3\%}{3\%} = 0.333\ldots = 33\frac{1}{3}\%.$$

In general, the term "percentage point(s)" indicates an absolute change or difference of percentages, while the percent sign or the word "percentage" refers to the relative change or difference.

== Indicators of relative change ==
The (classical) relative change above is but one of the possible measures/indicators of relative change. An indicator of relative change from $x$ (initial or reference value) to $y$ (new value) $R(x,y)$ is a binary real-valued function defined for the domain of interest which satisfies the following properties:

- Appropriate sign:
  $$\begin{cases}R(x,y)> 0 &\text{iff } y>x \\ R(x,y)= 0 &\text{iff } y=x \\ R(x,y)< 0 &\text{iff } y<x \end{cases}.$$
- R is an increasing function of y when x is fixed.
- R is continuous.
- Independent of the unit of measurement: for all $a>0$, $R(ax,ay) = R(x,y)$.
- Normalized: $\left.\frac{d}{dy} R(1,y) \right|_{y=1} = 1$

The normalization condition is motivated by the observation that $R$ scaled by a constant $c>0$ still satisfies the other conditions besides normalization. Furthermore, due to the independence condition, every $R$ can be written as a single argument function $H$ of the ratio $\textstyle \frac{y}{x}$. The normalization condition is then that $H'(1) = 1$. This implies all indicators behave like the classical one when $\textstyle \frac{y}{x}$ is close to 1.

Usually the indicator of relative change is presented as the actual change Δ scaled by some function of the values x and y, say f(x, y):
$$\text{Relative change}(x, y) = \frac{\text{Actual change}\,\Delta}{f(x,y)} = \frac{y - x}{f(x,y)}.$$

As with classical relative change, the general relative change is undefined if f(x, y) is zero. Various choices for the function f(x, y) have been proposed:

Indicators of relative change
Name	$f(x,y)$ where the indicator's value is $\tfrac{y-x}{f(x,y)}$	$H(y/x)$
(Classical) Relative change	x	$\frac y x - 1$
Reversed relative change	y	$1-\frac x y$
Arithmetic mean change	$\frac{1}{2}(x + y)$	$\frac{\frac{y}{x} - 1}{\frac{1}{2}\left(1 + \frac{y}{ x}\right)}$
Geometric mean change	$\sqrt{xy}$	$\frac{\frac y x - 1}{\sqrt{xy}}$
Harmonic mean change	$\frac 2 {\frac 1 x + \frac 1 y}$	$\frac{\left(\frac {y} {x} - 1\right)\left(1+\frac {x} {y}\right)}{2}$
Moment mean change of order k	$\left[\frac{1}{2}(x^{k} + y^{k})\right]^\frac{1}{k}$	$\frac{\frac y x - 1}{\left[\frac{1}{2}\left(1+\left(\frac y x\right)^k\right)\right]^\frac{1}{k}}$
Maximum mean change	$\max(x,y)$	$\frac{\frac y x - 1}{\max\left(1,\frac y x\right)}$
Minimum mean change	$\min(x,y)$	$\frac{\frac y x - 1}{\min\left(1,\frac y x\right)}$
Logarithmic (mean) change	$$\begin{cases} \frac{y-x}{\ln\frac{y}{x}}  & x \neq y \\ x & x = y \end{cases}$$	$\ln\frac{y}{x}$

As can be seen in the table, all but the first two indicators have, as denominator a mean. One of the properties of a mean function $m(x,y)$ is: $m(x,y) = m(y,x)$, which is to say that all such indicators have a "symmetry" property that the classical relative change lacks: $R(x,y) = -R(y,x)$. This agrees with intuition that a relative change from $x$ to $y$ should have the same magnitude as a relative change in the opposite direction, $y$ to $x$, just like the relation $\frac y x = \frac 1 {x/y}$ suggests.

Maximum mean change has been recommended when comparing floating point values in programming languages for equality with a certain tolerance. Another application is in the computation of approximation errors when the relative error of a measurement is required. Minimum mean change has been recommended for use in econometrics. Logarithmic change has been recommended as a general-purpose replacement for relative change and is discussed more below.

Tenhunen defines a general relative difference function from L (reference value) to K:
$$H(K,L) = \begin{cases}
\int_1^{K/L} t^{c-1} dt & \text{when } K>L \\
-\int_{K/L}^1 t^{c-1} dt & \text{when } K<L
\end{cases}$$

which leads to
$$H(K,L) = \begin{cases}
\frac{1}{c} \cdot ((K/L)^c-1) & c \neq 0 \\
\ln(K/L) & c = 0, K > 0, L > 0
\end{cases}$$

In particular for the special cases c = ±1,
$$H(K,L) = \begin{cases}
(K-L)/K & c=-1 \\
(K-L)/L & c=1
\end{cases}$$

== Logarithmic change ==
Of these indicators of relative change, arguably the most natural is the natural logarithm ($\ln$) of the ratio of the two numbers (final and initial), called log change. Indeed, when $\textstyle \left| \frac{V_1 - V_0}{V_0} \right| \ll 1$, the following approximation holds:
$$\begin{align} \ln\frac{V_1}{V_0}
&= \int_{V_0}^{V_1}\frac{{\mathrm d}V}{V} \approx \int_{V_0}^{V_1}\frac{{\mathrm d}V}{V_0} \\
&= \frac{V_1 - V_0}{V_0},
\end{align}$$
which is the classical relative change formula.

Because $\textstyle \ln\frac{V_1}{V_0} = \ln(V_1)-\ln(V_0)$, it follows that, when the previous condition holds, the difference between (natural) logarithms is approximately equal to the percentange change.

In the same way that relative change is scaled by 100 to get percentages, $\ln\frac{V_1}{V_0}$ can be scaled by 100 to get what is commonly called log points. Log points are equivalent to the unit centinepers (cNp) when measured for root-power quantities. This quantity has also been referred to as a log percentage and denoted L%. Since the derivative of the natural log at 1 is 1, log points are approximately equal to percent change for small differences – for example an increase of 1% equals an increase of 0.995 cNp, and a 5% increase gives a 4.88 cNp increase. This approximation property does not hold for other choices of logarithm base, which introduce a scaling factor due to the derivative not being 1. Log points can thus be used as a replacement for percent change.

=== Additivity ===
Using log change has the advantages of additivity compared to relative change. Specifically, when using log change, the total change after a series of changes equals the sum of the changes. With percent, summing the changes is only an approximation, with larger error for larger changes. For example:

Log change 0 (cNp)	Log change 1 (cNp)	Total log change (cNp)	Relative change 0 (%)	Relative change 1 (%)	Total relative change (%)
10	5	15	10	5	15.5
10	−5	5	10	−5	4.5
10	10	20	10	10	21
10	−10	0	10	−10	−1
50	50	100	50	50	125
50	−50	0	50	−50	−25

Note that in the above table, since "relative change 0" (respectively "relative change 1") has the same numerical value as "log change 0" (respectively "log change 1"), it does not correspond to the same variation. The conversion between relative and log changes may be computed as $\text{log change} = \ln(1 + \text{relative change})$.

By additivity, $\textstyle \ln\frac{V_1}{V_0} + \ln\frac{V_0}{V_1} = 0$, and therefore additivity implies a sort of symmetry property, namely $\ln\frac{V_1}{V_0} = - \ln\frac{V_0}{V_1}$ and thus the magnitude of a change expressed in log change is the same whether $V_0$ or $V_1$ is chosen as the reference. In contrast, for relative change, $\textstyle \frac{V_1 - V_0}{V_0} \neq - \frac{V_0 - V_1}{V_1}$, with the difference $\frac{(V_1 - V_0)^2}{V_0 V_1}$ becoming larger as $V_1$ or $V_0$ approaches 0 while the other remains fixed. For example:

V_{0}	V_{1}	Log change (cNp)	Relative change (%)
10	9	−10.5	−10.0
9	10	+10.5	+11.1
10	1	−230	−90
1	10	+230	+900
10	0^{+}	−∞	−100
0^{+}	10	+∞	+∞

Here 0^{+} means taking the limit from above towards 0.

=== Uniqueness and extensions ===
The log change is the unique two-variable function that is additive, and whose linearization matches relative change. There is a family of additive difference functions $F_\lambda(x,y)$ for any $\lambda\in\mathbb{R}$, such that absolute change is $F_0$ and log change is $F_1$.

== See also ==
- Approximation error
- Errors and residuals in statistics
- Relative standard deviation
- Logarithmic scale
