= Percentage point =

Unit for the arithmetic difference of two percentages

A percentage point or percent point is the description for the arithmetic difference between two percentages. For example, moving up from 40 percent to 44 percent is an increase of 4 percentage points (although it is a 10-percent increase in the quantity being measured, if the total amount remains the same). In written text, the unit (the percentage point) is usually either written out, or abbreviated as pp, p.p., or %pt. to avoid confusion with percentage increase or decrease in the actual quantity. After the first occurrence, some writers abbreviate by using just "point" or "points".

== Differences between percentages and percentage points ==
Consider the following hypothetical example: In 1980, 50 percent of the population smoked, and in 1990 only 40 percent of the population smoked. One can thus say that from 1980 to 1990, the prevalence of smoking decreased by 10 percentage points (or by 10 percent of the population) or by 20 percent when talking about smokers only – percentages indicate proportionate part of a total.

Percentage-point differences are one way to express a risk or probability. Consider a drug that cures a given disease in 70 percent of all cases, while without the drug, the disease heals spontaneously in only 50 percent of cases. The drug reduces absolute risk by 20 percentage points. Alternatives may be more meaningful to consumers of statistics, such as the reciprocal, also known as the number needed to treat (NNT). In this case, the reciprocal transform of the percentage-point difference would be 1/(20pp) = 1/0.20 = 5. Thus if 5 patients are treated with the drug, one could expect to cure one more patient than would have gotten well without receiving the treatment.

For measurements involving percentages as a unit, such as growth, yield, or ejection fraction, statistical deviations and related descriptive statistics, including the standard deviation and root-mean-square error, the result should be expressed in units of percentage points instead of percentage. Mistakenly using percentage as the unit for the standard deviation is confusing, since percentage is also used as a unit for the relative standard deviation, i.e. standard deviation divided by average value (coefficient of variation).

== Related units ==
- Percentage (%) 1 part in 100
- Per mille (‰) 1 part in 1,000
- Permyriad (‱) 1 part in 10,000
  - Basis point (bp) difference of 1 part in 10,000
- Per cent mille (pcm) 1 part in 100,000
- Parts-per notation parts per million (ppm) etc.

== See also ==
- Baker percentage – Mathematical notation in cooking
- Percent point function – Statistical function that defines the quantiles of a probability distribution
- Per-unit system – In power systems, expression of system quantities as fractions
- Relative change, also known as relative difference – Comparisons in quantitative sciences
