= Accepted and experimental value =

In science, and most specifically chemistry, the accepted value denotes a value of a substance accepted by almost all scientists and the experimental value denotes the value of a substance's properties found in a localized lab.

== See also ==
- Accuracy and precision
- Error
  - Approximation error
