= Per mille =

Unit for parts per thousand

‰o

Per mille
- In Unicode: U+2030 ‰ PER MILLE SIGN (&permil;)

Related
- See also: U+0025 % PERCENT SIGN; U+2031 ‱ PER TEN THOUSAND SIGN (Basis point)

The phrase per mille (from Latin per mīlle 'in each thousand') indicates parts per thousand. The associated symbol is ‰, similar to a per cent sign % but with an extra zero in the divisor.

Major dictionaries do not agree on the spelling, giving other options of per mil, per mill, permil, permill, and permille.

The word promille is the cognate in Danish, Dutch, German, Finnish, Norwegian and Swedish, and is sometimes seen as a loanword in English with the same meaning as per mille.

The symbol is included in the General Punctuation block of Unicode at U+2030 ‰ PER MILLE SIGN. There is also an Arabic-Indic per mille sign at U+0609 ؉ ARABIC-INDIC PER MILLE SIGN.

== Examples ==
=== Blood alcohol concentration ===
Promille and permille are likely best known as shorthand terms for Blood Alcohol Concentration, where 1 promille corresponds to 1 gram of alcohol per liter of blood. Promille is used in the legal limits of blood-alcohol content for driving a road vehicle in some countries: for example: 0.5‰ or 0.8‰.

=== Cost per mille ===
==== Sales and marketing ====
Cost per mille (CPM), the price of 1000 units, may be used for views of banner and display advertising, and for emails delivered by email service providers.

==== Insurance ====
In UK insurance usage, the cost per mille is the rate per £1000 of insured value. In India, the premium per mille is the rate expressed as thousandths of the sum assured.

=== Gradients ===
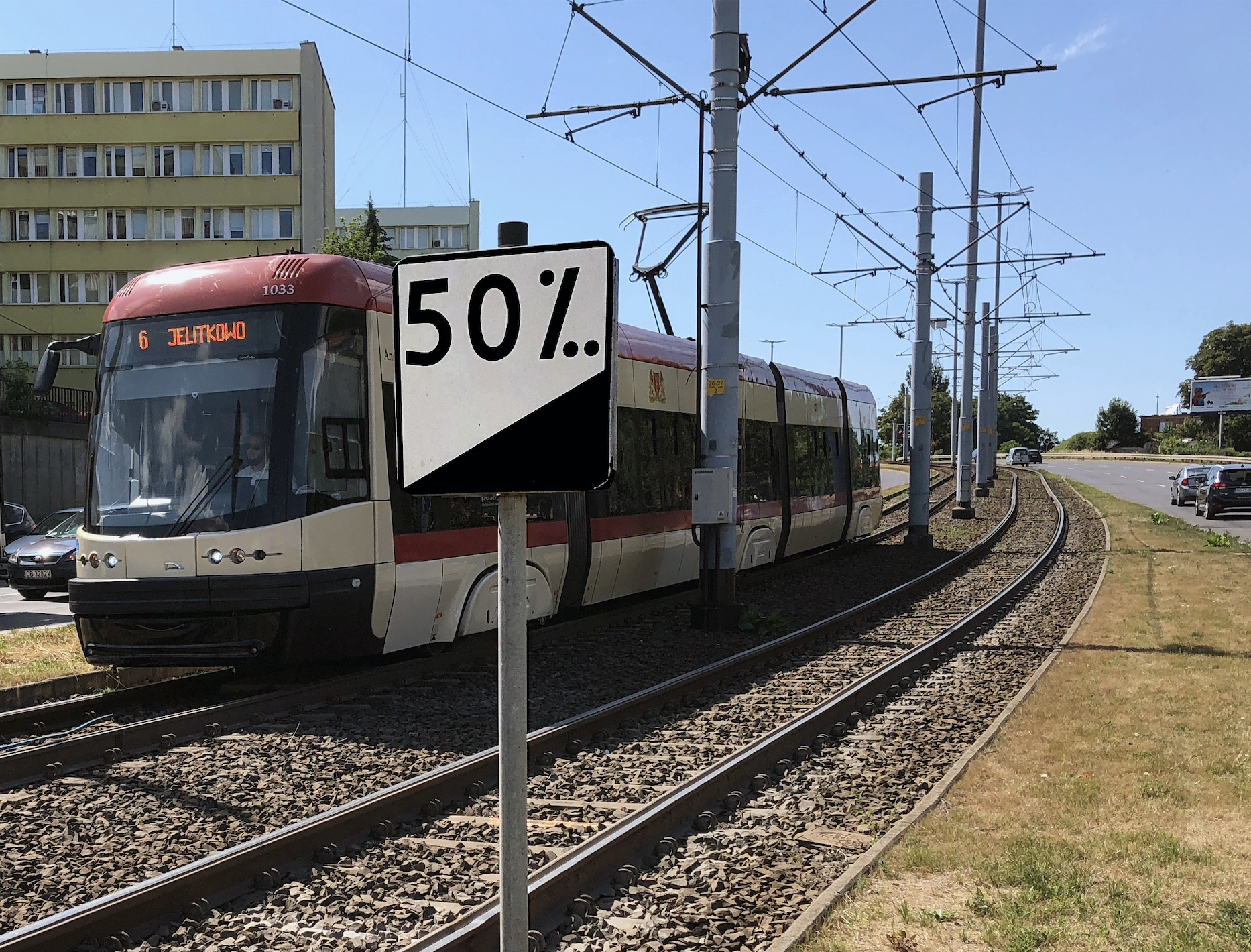
A tram and gradient sign in Gdańsk, Poland. The 50‰ grade is equivalent to 50 m/km or 5%.

Gradients (in some countries in Europe) may be expressed as mm/m or m/km, and written with the per mille symbol.

=== Isotope ratios ===
Per mille may be used to express stable isotope ratios—for example: "δ^{13}C was measured at −3.5‰".

=== Taxation ===
==== Charity fraction ====
In Italy, it is possible to nominate a charity or charities to receive "five per mille" (5‰) of personal taxation payments.

==== Property tax ====
Property taxation rates may be expressed as the millage rate (U.S.) or mill rate (Canada), from mill (currency), one thousandth of a dollar.

=== Quantile ===
Permille may also be used to express a 1000-quantile ("999th permille"), but this usage is rare and largely obsolete. Modern publications instead use fractional percentiles ("99.9th percentile").

=== Salinity ===
Seawater salinity is often expressed per mille. Average marine salinity is about 35 parts per thousand or 35‰ (3.5%).

== Related units ==
Visualisation of 1%, 1‰, 1‱, 1 pcm and 1 ppm as fractions of the large block (larger version)

- Percentage point difference of 1 part in 100
- Percentage (%) 1 part in 100
- Basis point (bp) difference of 1 part in 10,000
- Permyriad (‱) 1 part in 10,000
- Per cent mille (pcm) 1 part in 100,000

== See also ==
- Fineness of precious metals (given as "0.000-fine")
- Parts-per notation
- Per-unit system
- Percentile
