= Exactness =

In mathematics, exactness may refer to:

- Exact category
- Exact functor
  - Landweber exact functor theorem
- Exact sequence

== See also ==
- Exactness of measurements
- Accuracy and precision
