= Percent sign =

Symbol for the fraction of a hundred

%o

Percent sign
- In Unicode: U+0025 % PERCENT SIGN

Different from
- Different from: U+2052 ⁒ COMMERCIAL MINUS SIGN; U+00F7 ÷ DIVISION SIGN

Related
- See also: U+2030 ‰ PER MILLE SIGN; U+2031 ‱ PER TEN THOUSAND SIGN (Basis point)

The percent sign % (sometimes per cent sign in British English) is the symbol used to indicate a percentage, a number or ratio as a fraction of 100. Related signs include the permille (per thousand) sign ‰ and the permyriad (per ten thousand) sign ‱. Higher proportions use parts-per notation.

== Correct style ==
=== Form and spacing ===
English style guides prescribe writing the percent sign following the number without any space between (e.g. 50%). However, the International System of Units and ISO 31-0 standard prescribe a space between the number and percent sign, in line with the general practice of using a non-breaking space between a numerical value and its corresponding unit of measurement.

Other languages have other rules for spacing in front of the percent sign:

- In Basque, the percent sign is placed before the number and is spaced.
- In Croatian, the percent sign is spaced with a non-breaking space.
- In Czech and in Slovak, the percent sign is spaced with a non-breaking space if the number is used as a noun. In Czech, no space is inserted if the number is used as an adjective (e.g. "a 50% increase"), whereas Slovak uses a non-breaking space in this case as well.
- In Finnish, the percent sign is always spaced, and a case suffix can be attached to it using the colon (e.g. 50 %:n kasvu 'an increase of 50%').
- In French, the percent sign must be spaced with a non-breaking space.
- According to the Real Academia Española, in Spanish, the percent sign should be spaced. Despite that, in North American Spanish (Mexico and the US), several style guides and institutions either recommend the percent sign be written following the number without any space between or do so in their own publications in accordance with common usage in that region.
- In Russian, the percent sign is rarely spaced, contrary to the guidelines of the GOST 8.417-2002 state standard.
- According to the Swedish Language Council, the percent sign should be preceded by a space in Swedish, as all other units.
- In German, the space is prescribed by the regulatory body in the national standard DIN 5008.
- In Turkish and some other Turkic languages, the percent sign precedes rather than follows the number, without an intervening space.
- In Persian texts, the percent sign may either precede or follow the number, in either case without a space.
- In Arabic, the percent sign follows the number; as Arabic is written from right to left, this means that the percent sign is to the left of the number, usually without a space.
- In Hebrew, the percent sign is written to the right of the number, just as in English, without an intervening space. This is because numbers in Hebrew (which otherwise is written from right to left) are written from left to right, as in English.
- In Dutch, the official rule (NBN Z 01-002) is to place a space between the number and the sign (e.g. een stijging van 50 %), but most of the time, the space is missing (e.g. een stijging van 50%).

== Evolution ==
Prior to 1425, there is no known evidence of a special symbol being used for percentages. The Italian term per cento, "for a hundred", was used as well as several different abbreviations (e.g. "per 100", "p 100", "p cento"). Examples of this can be seen in the 1339 arithmetic text (author unknown) depicted below. The letter p with its descender crossed by a horizontal or diagonal stroke (to indicate abbreviation) conventionally stood for per, por, par, or pur in Medieval and Renaissance palaeography.

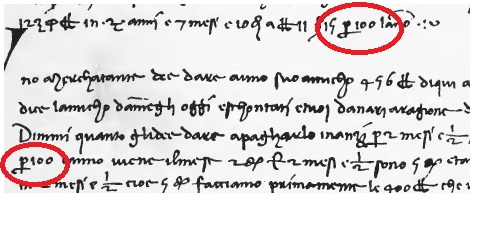
1339 arithmetic text in Rara Arithmetica, p. 437

At some point, a scribe used the abbreviation pc with a tiny loop or circle (depicting the ending -o used in Italian ordinals, as in primo, secondo; it is analogous to the English -th as in 25th). This appears in some additional pages of a 1425 text which were probably added around 1435.

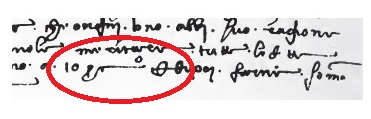
1425 arithmetic text in Rara Arithmetica, p. 440

The pc with a loop eventually evolved into a horizontal fraction sign by 1650 (see below for an example in a 1684 text) and thereafter lost the per.

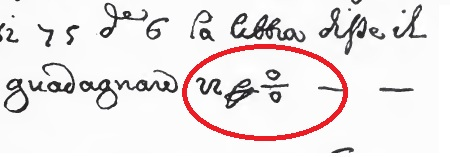
1684 arithmetic text in Rara Arithmetica, p. 441

In 1925, D. E. Smith wrote, "The solidus [slash] form is modern."

== Encodings ==
=== Unicode ===
The Unicode code points are:

- U+0025 % PERCENT SIGN (HTML &#37;, &percnt;),
- U+FF05 ％ FULLWIDTH PERCENT SIGN
- U+FE6A ﹪ SMALL PERCENT SIGN
- U+066A ٪ ARABIC PERCENT SIGN, which has the circles replaced by square dots set on edge, the shape of the digit 0 in Eastern Arabic numerals.
- U+332B ㌫ SQUARE PAASENTO, パーセント (pāsento, from English "percent") in one square character.

=== ASCII ===
The ASCII code for the percent character is 37, or 0x25 in hexadecimal.

== Other uses ==
=== In computers ===
Names for the percent sign include percent sign (in ITU-T), mod, grapes (in hacker jargon), and the humorous double-oh-seven (in INTERCAL).

In computing, the percent character is also used for the modulo operation in programming languages that derive their syntax from the C programming language, which in turn acquired this usage from the earlier B.

In the textual representation of URIs, a % immediately followed by a 2-digit hexadecimal number denotes an octet specifying (part of) a character that might otherwise not be allowed in URIs (see percent-encoding).

In SQL, the percent sign is a wildcard character in "LIKE" expressions, for example SELECT * FROM table WHERE fullname LIKE 'Lisa %' will fetch all records whose names start with "Lisa ".

In TeX (and therefore also in LaTeX) and PostScript, and in GNU Octave and MATLAB, a % denotes a line comment.

In BASIC, Visual Basic, ASP, and VBA a trailing % after a variable name marks it as an integer.

In ASP, the percent sign can be used to indicate the start and end of the ASP code <%...... %>

In Perl % is the sigil for hashes.

In many programming languages' string formatting operations (performed by functions such as printf and scanf), the percent sign denotes parts of the template string that will be replaced with arguments. (See printf format string.) In Python and Ruby the percent sign is also used as the string formatting operator.

In the command processors COMMAND.COM (DOS) and CMD.EXE (OS/2 and Windows), %1, %2, ... stand for the first, second, etc. parameters of a batch file. %0 stands for the specification of the batch file itself as typed on the command line. The % sign is also used similarly in the FOR command. %VAR1% represents the value of an environment variable named VAR1. Thus: set PATH=c:\;%PATH% sets a new value for PATH, that being the old value preceded by "c:\;". Because these uses give the percent sign special meaning, the sequence %% (two percent signs) is used to represent a literal percent sign, so that: set PATH=c:\;%%PATH%% would set PATH to the literal value "c:\;%PATH%".

In the C Shell and Z shell, % is part of the default command prompt.

=== In linguistics ===
In linguistics, the percent sign is prepended to an example sentence or other string to show that it is judged well-formed (grammatical) by some speakers and ill-formed by others. This may be due to differences in dialect or even individual idiolects. This use is similar to those of the asterisk to mark ill-formed strings, the question mark to mark strings where well-formedness is unclear, and the number sign to mark strings that are syntactically well-formed but semantically or pragmatically nonsensical.

== See also ==
- Basis point – One hundredth of one percentage point
- Metacharacter – Character that has a special meaning to a computer program
- Percentage point – Unit for the arithmetic difference of two percentages

== Sources ==
- Smith, D. E. (1898), Rara Arithmetica: a catalogue of the arithmetics written before MDCI, with description of those in the library of George Arthur Plimpton of New York, Boston: Ginn
- Smith, D. E. (1925), History of Mathematics, vol. 2, Boston: Ginn
