= Percentage =

Number or ratio expressed as a fraction of 100

A pie chart showing the percentage by web browser visiting Wikimedia sites (April 2009 to 2012)

In mathematics, a percentage, percent, or per cent (from Latin per centum 'by a hundred') is a number or ratio expressed as a fraction of 100. It is often denoted using the percent sign (%), although the abbreviations pct., pct, and sometimes pc are also used. A percentage is a dimensionless number (pure number), primarily used for expressing proportions, but percent is nonetheless a unit of measurement in its orthography and usage.

== Examples ==
For example, 45% (read as "forty-five percent") is equal to the fraction 45/100, or 0.45. Percentages are often used to express a proportionate part of a total.

(Similarly, one can also express a number as a fraction of 1,000, using the term "per mille" or the symbol "‰".)

=== Example 1 ===
If 50% of the total number of students in the class are male, that means that 50 out of every 100 students are male. If there are 500 students, then 250 of them are male.

=== Example 2 ===
An increase of $0.15 on a price of $2.50 is an increase by a fraction of 0.15/2.50 = 0.06. Expressed as a percentage, this is a 6% increase.

While many percentage values are between 0 and 100, there is no mathematical restriction and percentages may take on other values. For example, it is common to refer to values such as 111% or −35%, especially for percent changes and comparisons.

== History ==
In Ancient Rome, long before the existence of the decimal system, computations were often made in fractions in the multiples of 1/100. For example, Augustus levied a tax of 1/100 on goods sold at auction known as centesima rerum venalium. Computation with these fractions was equivalent to computing percentages.

As denominations of money grew in the Middle Ages, computations with a denominator of 100 became increasingly standard, such that from the late 15th century to the early 16th century, it became common for arithmetic texts to include such computations. Many of these texts applied these methods to profit and loss, interest rates, and the Rule of Three. By the 17th century, it was standard to quote interest rates in hundredths.

== Percent sign ==
A percent sign

The term "percent" is derived from the Latin per centum, meaning "hundred" or "by the hundred". The sign for "percent" evolved by gradual contraction of the Italian term per cento, meaning "for a hundred". The "per" was often abbreviated as "p."—eventually disappeared entirely. The "cento" was contracted to two circles separated by a horizontal line, from which the modern "%" symbol is derived.

== Calculations ==
The percent value is computed by multiplying the numeric value of the ratio by 100. For example, to find 50 apples as a percentage of 1,250 apples, one first computes the ratio 50/1250 = 0.04, and then multiplies by 100 to obtain 4%. The percent value can also be found by multiplying first instead of later, so in this example, the 50 would be multiplied by 100 to give 5,000, and this result would be divided by 1,250 to give 4%.

To calculate a percentage of a percentage, convert both percentages to fractions of 100, or to decimals, and multiply them. For example, 50% of 40% is:

50/100 × 40/100 = 0.50 × 0.40 = 0.20 = 20/100 = 20%.

It is not correct to divide by 100 and use the percent sign at the same time; it would literally imply division by 10,000. For example, 25% = 25/100 = 0.25, not 25%/100, which actually is 25/100/100 = 0.0025. A term such as 100/100% would also be incorrect, since it would be read as 1 percent, even if the intent was to say 100%.

Whenever communicating about a percentage, it is important to specify what it is relative to (i.e., what is the total that corresponds to 100%). The following problem illustrates this point.

In a certain college 60% of all students are female, and 10% of all students are computer science majors. If 5% of female students are computer science majors, what percentage of computer science majors are female?

We are asked to compute the ratio of female computer science majors to all computer science majors. We know that 60% of all students are female, and among these 5% are computer science majors, so we conclude that 60/100 × 5/100 = 3/100 or 3% of all students are female computer science majors. Dividing this by the 10% of all students that are computer science majors, we arrive at the answer: 3%/10% = 30/100 or 30% of all computer science majors are female.

This example is closely related to the concept of conditional probability.

Because of the commutative property of multiplication, reversing expressions does not change the result; for example, 50% of 20 is 10, and 20% of 50 is 10.

== Variants of the percentage calculation ==
The calculation of percentages is carried out and taught in different ways depending on the prerequisites and requirements. In this way, the usual formulas can be obtained with proportions, which saves them from having to remember them. In so-called mental arithmetic, the intermediary question is usually asked what 100% or 1% is (corresponds to).

Example:

42 kg is 7%. How much is (corresponds to) 100%?
Given are W (percentage) and p % (percentage).
We are looking for G (basic value).

With general formula	With own ratio equation (Proportion)	With “What is 1%?” (Rule of 3) $\frac{p\,\%}{42\,\text{kg}}=\frac{100\,\%}{7\ \%}$
$\frac{p\,\%}{100\,\%}=\frac{W}{G}$ multiple rearrangements result in: $G=\frac{W}{p\,\%}\cdot{100\,\%}$ $G=\frac{42\,\text{ kg}}{7\,\%}\cdot{100\,\%}=600\,\text{kg}$	$\frac{G}{42\,\text{kg}}=\frac{100\,\%}{7\,\%}$ simple conversion yields: $G=\frac{42\,\text{kg}}{7\,\%}\cdot{100\,\%}=600\,\text{ kg}$	$\frac{42\,\text{kg}:{ \color{red}7}}{7\,\%:{ \color{red}7}}=\frac{6\,\text{ kg}}{1\,\%}=\frac{6\,\text{kg}\cdot { \color{red}100}}{1\,\%\cdot { \color{red}100}}$ without changing the last counter is: $G=6\,\text{kg}\cdot 100=600\,\text{ kg}$
Advantage: • One formula for all tasks	Advantages: • Without a formula • Easy to change over if the size you are looking for—here G—is in the top left of the counter.	Advantages: • Without a formula • Simple rule of three – here as a chain of equations • Application for mental arithmetic

== Percentage increase and decrease ==
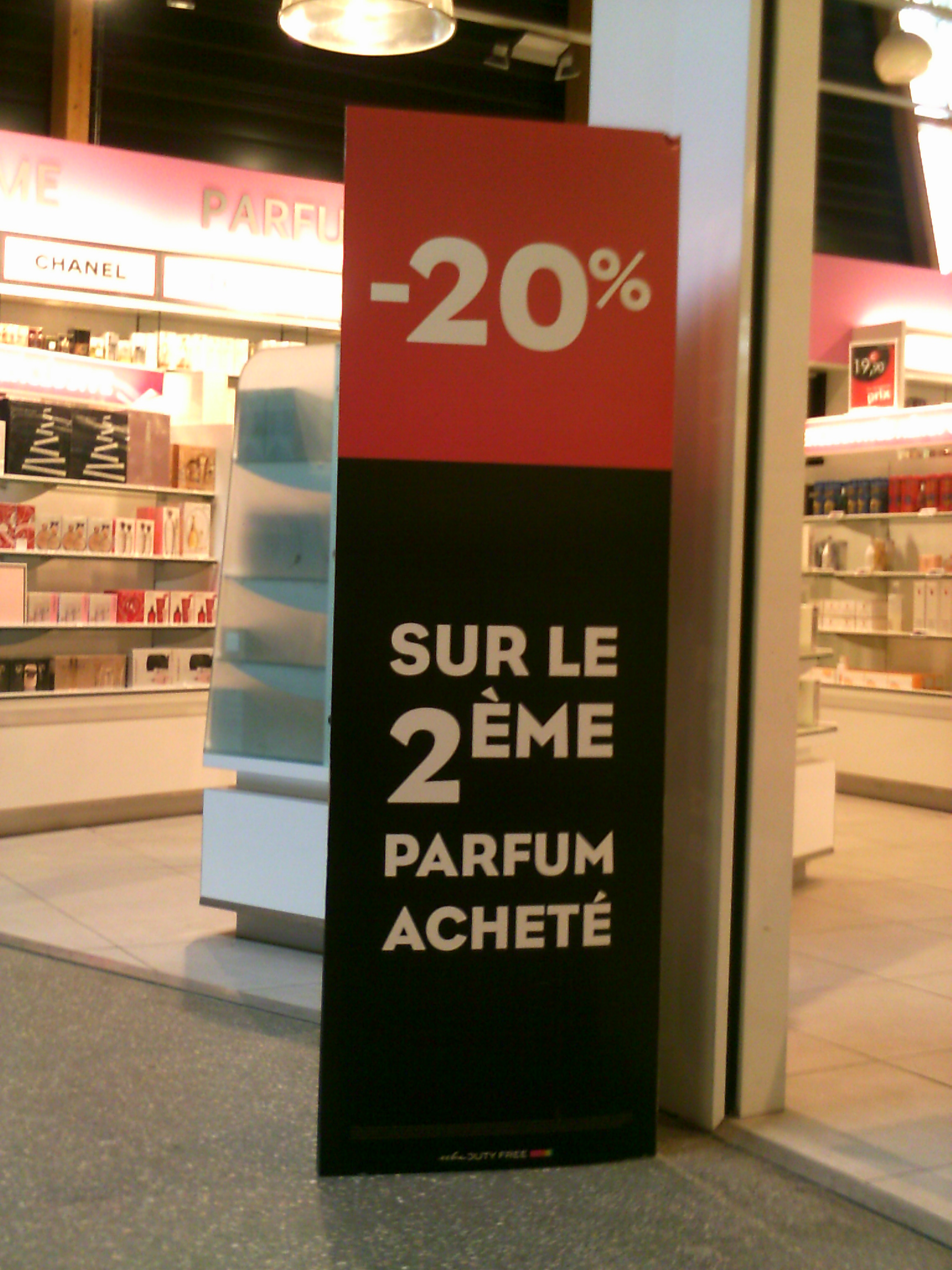
Placard outside a shop in Bordeaux advertising 20% decrease in the price of the second perfume purchased.

Due to inconsistent usage, it is not always clear from the context what a percentage is relative to. When speaking of a "10% rise" or a "10% fall" in a quantity, the usual interpretation is that this is relative to the initial value of that quantity. For example, if an item is initially priced at $200 and the price rises 10% (an increase of $20), the new price will be $220. Note that this final price is 110% of the initial price (100% + 10% = 110%).

Some other examples of percent changes:

- An increase of 100% in a quantity means that the final amount is 200% of the initial amount (100% of initial + 100% of increase = 200% of initial). In other words, the quantity has doubled.
- An increase of 800% means the final amount is 9 times the original (100% + 800% = 900% = 9 times as large).
- A decrease of 60% means the final amount is 40% of the original (100% – 60% = 40%).
- A decrease of 100% means the final amount is zero (100% – 100% = 0%).

In general, a change of x percent in a quantity results in a final amount that is 100 + x percent of the original amount (equivalently, (1 + 0.01x) times the original amount). An important property of these changes is their non-symmetrical reversibility; a percentage increase requires a different percentage decrease to return to the original value. For example, a 25% increase ($100 to $125) must be followed by a 20% decrease ($125 to $100) to restore the initial amount. Understanding these reciprocal relationships is a common requirement in markup and margin calculations, where the "reversing percentage" is calculated as (1 / (1 + r)) - 1, where r is the initial rate.

== Compounding percentages ==
Percent changes applied sequentially do not add up in the usual way. For example, if the 10% increase in price considered earlier (on the $200 item, raising its price to $220) is followed by a 10% decrease in the price (a decrease of $22), then the final price will be $198—not the original price of $200. The reason for this apparent discrepancy is that the two percent changes (+10% and −10%) are measured relative to different initial values ($200 and $220, respectively), and thus do not "cancel out".

In general, if an increase of x percent is followed by a decrease of x percent, and the initial amount was p, the final amount is p(1 + 0.01x)(1 − 0.01x) = p(1 − (0.01x)^{2}); hence the net change is an overall decrease by x percent of x percent (the square of the original percent change when expressed as a decimal number). Thus, in the above example, after an increase and decrease of x = 10 percent, the final amount, $198, was 10% of 10%, or 1%, less than the initial amount of $200. The net change is the same for a decrease of x percent, followed by an increase of x percent; the final amount is p(1 - 0.01x)(1 + 0.01x) = p(1 − (0.01x)^{2}). This multiplicative nature means that calculating a percentage of a percentage requires treating each as a fraction of the whole. For instance, determining a 20% portion within a 50% segment results in 10% of the total ($0.20 \times 0.50 = 0.10$). This distinction is vital in financial modeling and statistical analysis to avoid "additive fallacies" when dealing with nested ratios. A step-by-step breakdown of these multi-layered calculations can be used to verify complex results involving such nested percentages.

This can be expanded for a case where one does not have the same percent change. If the initial amount p leads to a percent change x, and the second percent change is y, then the final amount is p(1 + 0.01x)(1 + 0.01y). To change the above example, after an increase of x = 10 percent and decrease of y = −5 percent, the final amount, $209, is 4.5% more than the initial amount of $200.

As shown above, percent changes can be applied in any order and have the same effect.

In the case of interest rates, a very common but ambiguous way to say that an interest rate rose from 10% per annum to 15% per annum, for example, is to say that the interest rate increased by 5%, which could theoretically mean that it increased from 10% per annum to 10.5% per annum. It is clearer to say that the interest rate increased by 5 percentage points (pp). The same confusion between the different concepts of percent(age) and percentage points can potentially cause a major misunderstanding when journalists report about election results, for example, expressing both new results and differences with earlier results as percentages. For example, if a party obtains 41% of the vote and this is said to be a 2.5% increase, does that mean the earlier result was 40% (since 41 = 40 × (1 + 2.5/100)) or 38.5% (since 41 = 38.5 + 2.5)?

In financial markets, it is common to refer to an increase of one percentage point (e.g. from 3% per annum to 4% per annum) as an increase of "100 basis points".

== Word and symbol ==
In most forms of English, percent is usually written as two words (per cent), although percentage and percentile are written as one word. In American English, percent is the most common variant (but per mille is written as two words).

In the early 20th century, there was a dotted abbreviation form "per cent.", as opposed to "per cent". The form "per cent." is still in use in the highly formal language found in certain documents like commercial loan agreements (particularly those subject to, or inspired by, common law), as well as in the Hansard transcripts of British Parliamentary proceedings. The term has been attributed to Latin per centum. The symbol for percent (%) evolved from a symbol abbreviating the Italian per cento. In some other languages, the form procent or prosent is used instead. Some languages use both a word derived from percent and an expression in that language meaning the same thing, e.g. Romanian procent and la sută (thus, 10% can be read or sometimes written ten for [each] hundred, similarly with the English one out of ten). Other abbreviations are rarer, but sometimes seen.

Grammar and style guides often differ as to how percentages are to be written. For instance, it is commonly suggested that the word percent (or per cent) be spelled out in all texts, as in "1 percent" and not "1%". Other guides prefer the word to be written out in humanistic texts, but the symbol to be used in scientific texts. Most guides agree that they always be written with a numeral, as in "5 percent" and not "five percent", the only exception being at the beginning of a sentence: "Ten percent of all writers love style guides." Decimals are also to be used instead of fractions, as in "3.5 percent of the gain" and not "3 1/2 percent of the gain". However the titles of bonds issued by governments and other issuers use the fractional form, e.g. "3 1/2% Unsecured Loan Stock 2032 Series 2". (When interest rates are very low, the number 0 is included if the interest rate is less than 1%, e.g. "0 3/4% Treasury Stock", not "3/4% Treasury Stock".) It is also widely accepted to use the percent symbol (%) in tabular and graphic material.

In line with common English practice, style guides—such as The Chicago Manual of Style—generally state that the number and percent sign are written without any space in between. However, the International System of Units and the ISO 31-0 standard require a space.

== Other uses ==
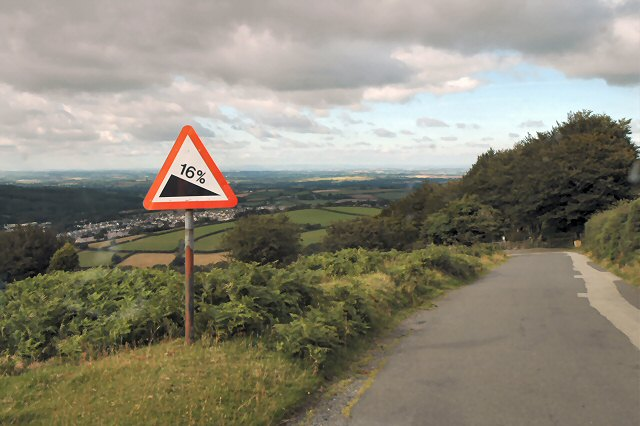
Percent used to indicate a road's steepness down.

The word "percentage" is often a misnomer in the context of sports statistics, when the referenced number is expressed as a decimal proportion, not a percentage: "The Phoenix Suns' Shaquille O'Neal led the NBA with a .609 field goal percentage (FG%) during the 2008–09 season." (O'Neal made 60.9% of his shots, not 0.609%.) Likewise, the winning percentage of a team, the fraction of matches that the club has won, is also usually expressed as a decimal proportion; a team that has a .500 winning percentage has won 50% of their matches. The practice is probably related to the similar way that batting averages are quoted.

As "percent" it is used to describe the grade or slope, the steepness of a road or railway, formula for which is 100 × rise/run which could also be expressed as the tangent of the angle of inclination times 100. This is the ratio of distances a vehicle would advance vertically and horizontally, respectively, when going up- or downhill, expressed in percent.

Percentage is also used to express composition of a mixture by mass percent and mole percent.

== Related units ==
Visualisation of 1%, 1‰, 1‱, 1 pcm and 1 ppm as fractions of the large block (larger version)

- Percentage point difference of 1 part in 100
- Per mille (‰) 1 part in 1,000
- Basis point (bp) difference of 1 part in 10,000
- Permyriad (‱) 1 part in 10,000
- Per cent mille (pcm) 1 part in 100,000
- Centiturn

== Practical applications ==
- Baker percentage
- Volume percent

== See also ==
- Relative change and difference
- Percent difference
- Percentage change
- Parts-per notation
- Per-unit system
- Percent point function
