= Per-unit system =

In power systems, expression of system quantities as fractions

In the power systems analysis field of electrical engineering, a per-unit system is the expression of system quantities as fractions of a defined base unit quantity. Calculations are simplified because quantities expressed as per-unit do not change when they are referred from one side of a transformer to the other. This can be a pronounced advantage in power system analysis where large numbers of transformers may be encountered. Moreover, similar types of apparatus will have the impedances lying within a narrow numerical range when expressed as a per-unit fraction of the equipment rating, even if the unit size varies widely. Conversion of per-unit quantities to volts, ohms, or amperes requires a knowledge of the base that the per-unit quantities were referenced to. The per-unit system is used in power flow, short circuit evaluation, motor starting studies etc.

The main idea of a per unit system is to absorb large differences in absolute values into base relationships. Thus, representations of elements in the system with per unit values become more uniform.

A per-unit system provides units for power, voltage, current, impedance, and admittance. With the exception of impedance and admittance, any two units are independent and can be selected as base values; power and voltage are typically chosen. All quantities are specified as multiples of selected base values. For example, the base power might be the rated power of a transformer, or perhaps an arbitrarily selected power which makes power quantities in the system more convenient. The base voltage might be the nominal voltage of a bus. Different types of quantities are labeled with the same symbol (pu); it should be clear whether the quantity is a voltage, current, or other unit of measurement.

== Purpose ==
There are several reasons for using a per-unit system:

- Similar apparatus (generators, transformers, lines) will have similar per-unit impedances and losses expressed on their own rating, regardless of their absolute size. Because of this, per-unit data can be checked rapidly for gross errors. A per unit value out of normal range is worth looking into for potential errors.
- Manufacturers usually specify the impedance of apparatus in per unit values.
- Use of the constant $\textstyle \sqrt{3}$ is reduced in three-phase calculations.
- Per-unit quantities are the same on either side of a transformer, independent of voltage level
- By normalizing quantities to a common base, both hand and automatic calculations are simplified.
- It improves numerical stability of automatic calculation methods.
- Per unit data representation yields important information about relative magnitudes.

The per-unit system was developed to make manual analysis of power systems easier. Although power-system analysis is now done by computer, results are often expressed as per-unit values on a convenient system-wide base.

== Base quantities ==
Generally base values of power and voltage are chosen. The base power may be the rating of a single piece of apparatus such as a motor or generator. If a system is being studied, the base power is usually chosen as a convenient round number such as 10 MVA or 100 MVA. The base voltage is chosen as the nominal rated voltage of the system. All other base quantities are derived from these two base quantities. Once the base power and the base voltage are chosen, the base current and the base impedance are determined by the natural laws of electrical circuits. The base value should only be a magnitude, while the per-unit value is a phasor. The phase angles of complex power, voltage, current, impedance, etc., are not affected by the conversion to per unit values.

The purpose of using a per-unit system is to simplify conversion between different transformers. Hence, it is appropriate to illustrate the steps for finding per-unit values for voltage and impedance. First, let the base power (S_{base}) of each end of a transformer become the same. Once every S is set on the same base, the base voltage and base impedance for every transformer can easily be obtained. Then, the real numbers of impedances and voltages can be substituted into the per-unit calculation definition to get the answers for the per-unit system. If the per-unit values are known, the real values can be obtained by multiplying by the base values.

By convention, the following two rules are adopted for base quantities:

- The base power value is the same for the entire power system of concern.
- The ratio of the voltage bases on either side of a transformer is selected to be the same as the ratio of the transformer voltage ratings.

With these two rules, a per-unit impedance remains unchanged when referred from one side of a transformer to the other. This allows the ideal transformer to be eliminated from a transformer model.

== Relationship between units ==
The relationship between units in a per-unit system depends on whether the system is single-phase or three-phase.

=== Single-phase ===
Assuming that the independent base values are power and voltage, we have:

$$P_{\text{base}} = 1 \text{ pu}$$
$$V_{\text{base}} = 1 \text{ pu}$$

Alternatively, the base value for power may be given in terms of reactive or apparent power, in which case we have, respectively,

$$Q_{\text{base}} = 1 \text{ pu}$$

or

$$S_{\text{base}} = 1 \text{ pu}$$

The rest of the units can be derived from power and voltage using the equations $S = IV$, $P = S\cos(\phi)$, $Q = S\sin(\phi)$ and $\underline{V} = \underline{I} \underline{Z}$ (Ohm's law), $Z$ being represented by $\underline{Z} = R + j X = Z\cos(\phi) + j Z\sin(\phi)$. We have:

$$I_{\text{base}} = \frac{S_{\text{base}}}{V_{\text{base}}} = 1 \text{ pu}$$
$$Z_{\text{base}} = \frac{V_{\text{base}}}{I_{\text{base}}} = \frac{V_{\text{base}}^{2}}{I_{\text{base}}V_{\text{base}}} = \frac{V_{\text{base}}^{2}}{S_{\text{base}}} = 1 \text{ pu}$$
$$Y_{\text{base}} = \frac{1}{Z_{\text{base}}} = 1 \text{ pu}$$

=== Three-phase ===
Power and voltage are specified in the same way as single-phase systems. However, due to differences in what these terms usually represent in three-phase systems, the relationships for the derived units are different. Specifically, power is given as total (not per-phase) power, and voltage is line-to-line voltage. In three-phase systems the equations $P = S\cos(\phi)$ and $Q = S\sin(\phi)$ also hold. The apparent power $S$ now equals $S_{\text{base}}= \sqrt{3}V_{\text{base}} I_{\text{base}}$

$$I_{\text{base}} = \frac{S_{\text{base}}}{V_{\text{base}} \times \sqrt{3}} = 1 \text{ pu}$$
$$Z_{\text{base}} = \frac{V_{\text{base}}}{I_{\text{base}} \times \sqrt{3}} = \frac{{V_{\text{base}}^2}}{S_{\text{base}}} = 1 \text{ pu}$$
$$Y_{\text{base}} = \frac{1}{Z_{\text{base}}} = 1 \text{ pu}$$

== Example of per-unit ==
As an example of how per-unit is used, consider a three-phase power transmission system that deals with powers of the order of 500 MW and uses a nominal voltage of 138 kV for transmission. We arbitrarily select $S_{\mathrm{base}} = 500\, \mathrm{MVA}$, and use the nominal voltage 138 kV as the base voltage $V_{\mathrm{base}}$. We then have:

$$I_{\text{base}} = \frac{S_{\text{base}}}{V_{\text{base}} \times \sqrt{3}} = 2.09 \, \mathrm{kA}$$
$$Z_{\text{base}} = \frac{V_{\text{base}}}{I_{\text{base}} \times \sqrt{3}} = \frac{V_{\text{base}}^{2}}{S_{\text{base}}} = 38.1 \, \Omega$$
$$Y_{\mathrm{base}} = \frac{1}{Z_{\mathrm{base}}} = 26.3 \, \mathrm{mS}$$

If, for example, the actual voltage at one of the buses is measured to be 136 kV, we have:

$$V_{\mathrm{pu}} = \frac{V}{V_{\mathrm{base}}} = \frac{136 \, \mathrm{kV}}{138 \, \mathrm{kV}} = 0.9855 \, \mathrm{pu}$$

== Per-unit system formulas ==
The following tabulation of per-unit system formulas is adapted from Beeman's Industrial Power Systems Handbook.

Equation
Base number selection
	Arbitrarily selecting from ohm's law the two base numbers: base voltage and base current
1	$\text{We have, Z}=\frac{E}{I}$
2	$\text{Base ohms}=\frac{\text{base volts}}{\text{base amperes}}$
3	$\text{Per-unit volts}=\frac{\text{volts}}{\text{base volts}}$
4	$\text{Per-unit amperes}=\frac{\text{amperes}}{\text{base amperes}}$
5	$\text{Per-unit ohms}=\frac{\text{ohms}}{\text{base ohms}}$
	Alternatively, choosing base volts and base kva values, we have,
	in single-phase systems:
6	$\text{Base amperes }=\frac{\text{base kva}\cdot 1000}{\text{base volts}}$
7	$\text{Base amperes }=\frac{\text{base kva}}{\text{base kv}_{L-L}}$
8	$\text{Base ohms }=\frac{\text{base volts}}{\text{base amperes}}$
	and in three-phase systems:
9	$\text{Base amperes }=\frac{\text{base kva}\cdot 1000}{\sqrt{3 } \cdot \text{base volts}}$
10	$\text{Base amperes }=\frac{\text{base kva}}{\sqrt{3 } \cdot \text{base kv}_{L-L}}$
11	$\text{Base ohms }=\frac{\text{base volts}}{\sqrt{3 } \cdot \text{base amperes}}$
	Working out for convenience per-unit ohms directly, we have
	for single-phase and three-phase systems:
12	$\text{Base ohms }=\frac{\text{ohms} \cdot \text{base kva}}{kv_{L-L}^2 \cdot 1000}$
Short-Circuit Calculation Formulas
	Ohms conversions:
13	$\text{Per-unit ohms reactance} =\frac{\text{ohms reactance}\cdot\text{kva base}}{kv_{L-L}^2 \cdot 1000}$
14	$\text{Ohms reactance} =\frac{\%\text{ reactance}\cdot kv_{L-L}^2 \cdot 1000}{\text{kva base}}$
15	$\text{Per-unit ohms reactance} = \frac{\text{per cent ohms reactance}}{100}$
	Changing ohms from one kva base to another:
16	$\%\text{ ohms reactance on kva base}_2=\frac{\text{kva base}_2}{\text{kva base}_1} \cdot \%\text{ ohms reactance on base}_1$
17	$\text{0/1 ohms reactance on kva base}_2=\frac{\text{kva base}_2}{\text{kva base}_1}\cdot 0/1 \text{ ohms reactance on base}_1$
	Changing incoming system reactance:
	a. If system reactance is given in percent, use Eq. 16 to change from one kva base to another.
	b. If system reactance is given in short-circuit symmetrical rms kva or current, convert to per-unit as follows:
18	$\text{0/1 reactance} = \frac{\text{kva base used in reactance in studied calculation}}{\text{system short-circuit kva}}$
19	$\text{0/1 reactance} = \frac{\text{kva base used in reactance in studied calculation}}{\text{system short-circuit current}\cdot\sqrt{3} \cdot\text{system kv}_{L-L}}$
	Calculating approximate motor kva base:
	a. For induction motors and 0.8 power factor synchronous motors
20	$\text{kva base} \approx\text{ horsepower rating}$
	b. For unity power factor synchronous motors
21	$\text{kva base} 0.8 \cdot\approx\text{horsepower rating}$
	Converting ohms from one voltage to another:
22	$\text{Ohms on basis of voltage}_1 =\left(\frac{\text{voltage}_1}{\text{voltage}_2}\right)^2 \cdot\text{ohms on basis of voltage}_2$
	Short-circuit kva and current calculations
	Symmetrical short circuit kva:
23	$=100 \cdot \frac{\text{kva base}}{\%\text{ X}}$
24	$=\frac{\text{kva base}}{\text{0/1 X}}$
25	$=3 \cdot \frac{\text{Voltage}_{L-N}^2}{\text{ohms reactance}\cdot 1000}$
26	$=\frac{\text{kv}_{L-L}^2 \cdot 1000}{\text{ohms reactance}}$
	Symmetrical short circuit current:
27	$=100 \cdot\frac{\text{kva base}}{\%\text{ X}\cdot \sqrt{3} \cdot\text{kv}_{L-L}}$
28	$=\frac{\text{kva base}}{\text{0/1 X}\cdot \sqrt{3} \cdot\text{kv}_{L-L}}$
29	$=\frac{\text{kv}_{L-L} \cdot 1000}{\sqrt{3} \cdot \text{ohms reactance}}$
	Asymmetrical short-circuit current and kva:
30	$\text{Asymmetrical short-circuit current = symmetrical current}\cdot \text{X/R factor}$
31	$\text{Asymmetrical short-circuit kva = symmetrical kva}\cdot \text{X/R factor}$

== In transformers ==
It can be shown that voltages, currents, and impedances in a per-unit system will have the same values whether they are referred to primary or secondary of a transformer.

For instance, for voltage, we can prove that the per unit voltages of two sides of the transformer, side 1 and side 2, are the same. Here, the per-unit voltages of the two sides are E_{1pu} and E_{2pu} respectively.

$$\begin{align}
E_\text{1,pu}&=\frac{E_{1}}{V_\text{base1}}\\
&= \frac {N_{1}E_{2}}{N_{2}V_\text{base1}} \\
&= \frac {N_{1}E_{2}}{N_{2} \frac{N_{1}}{N_{2}} V_\text{base2}}\\
&= \frac {E_{2}} {V_\text{base2}}\\
&= E_\text{2,pu}\\
\end{align}$$

(source: Alexandra von Meier Power System Lectures, UC Berkeley)

E_{1} and E_{2} are the voltages of sides 1 and 2 in volts. N_{1} is the number of turns the coil on side 1 has. N_{2} is the number of turns the coil on side 2 has. V_{base1} and V_{base2} are the base voltages on sides 1 and 2.

$$V_\text{base1}=\frac{N_{1}}{N_{2}}V_\text{base2}$$

For current, we can prove that the per-unit currents of the two sides are the same below.

$$\begin{align}
I_\text{1,pu}&=\frac{I_{1}}{I_\text{base1}}\\
&= \frac {N_{2}I_{2}}{N_{1}I_\text{base1}} \\
&= \frac {N_{2}I_{2}}{N_{1} \frac{N_{2}}{N_{1}} I_{base2}}\\
&= \frac {I_{2}} {I_\text{base2}}\\
&= I_\text{2,pu}\\
\end{align}$$

(source: Alexandra von Meier Power System Lectures, UC Berkeley)

where I_{1,pu} and I_{2,pu} are the per-unit currents of sides 1 and 2 respectively. In this, the base currents I_{base1} and I_{base2} are related in the opposite way that V_{base1} and V_{base2} are related, in that

$$\begin{align}
I_\text{base1} &= \frac{S_\text{base1}} {V_\text{base1}}\\
S_\text{base1} &= S_\text{base2}\\
V_\text{base2} &= \frac{N_{2}}{N_{1}} V_\text{base1}\\
I_\text{base2} &= \frac{S_\text{base2}} {V_\text{base2}}\\
I_\text{base1} &= \frac{S_\text{base2}} { \frac{N_{1}}{N_{2}} V_\text{base2}}\\
&= \frac{N_{2}}{N_{1}} I_\text{base2}\\
\end{align}$$

The reason for this relation is for power conservation

S_{base1} = S_{base2}

The full load copper loss of a transformer in per-unit form is equal to the per-unit value of its resistance:

$$\begin{align}
P_\text{cu,FL}&=\text{full-load copper loss}\\
&= I_{R1}^2R_{eq1}\\
\end{align}$$

$$\begin{align}
P_\text{cu,FL,pu}&=\frac{P_\text{cu,FL}}{P_\text{base}}\\
&= \frac {I_{R1}^2R_{eq1}} {V_{R1}I_{R1}}\\
&= \frac {R_\text{eq1}} {V_{R1}/I_{R1}}\\
&= \frac {R_\text{eq1}} {Z_{B1}}\\
&= R_\text{eq1,pu}\\
\end{align}$$

Therefore, it may be more useful to express the resistance in per-unit form as it also represents the full-load copper loss.

As stated above, there are two degrees of freedom within the per unit system that allow the engineer to specify any per unit system. The degrees of freedom are the choice of the base voltage (V_{base}) and the base power (S_{base}). By convention, a single base power (S_{base}) is chosen for both sides of the transformer and its value is equal to the rated power of the transformer. By convention, there are actually two different base voltages that are chosen, V_{base1} and V_{base2} which are equal to the rated voltages for either side of the transformer. By choosing the base quantities in this manner, the transformer can be effectively removed from the circuit as described above. For example:

Take a transformer that is rated at 10 kVA and 240/100 V. The secondary side has an impedance equal to 1∠0° Ω. The base impedance on the secondary side is equal to:

$$\begin{align}
Z_\text{base,2}&=\frac{V_\text{base,2}^2}{S_\text{base}}\\
&= \frac {(100\text{ V})^2} {10000\text{ VA}}\\
&= \text{1 }\Omega\\
\end{align}$$

This means that the per unit impedance on the secondary side is 1∠0° Ω / 1 Ω = 1∠0° pu When this impedance is referred to the other side, the impedance becomes:

$$\begin{align}
Z_{2}&=\left(\frac{240}{100}\right)^2\times\text{1∠0° }\Omega\\
&= \text {5.76∠0° }\Omega\\
\end{align}$$

The base impedance for the primary side is calculated the same way as the secondary:

$$\begin{align}
Z_\text{base,1}&=\frac{V_\text{base,1}^2}{S_\text{base}}\\
&= \frac {(240\text{ V})^2} {10000\text{ VA}}\\
&= \text{5.76 }\Omega\\
\end{align}$$

This means that the per unit impedance is 5.76∠0° Ω / 5.76 Ω = 1∠0° pu, which is the same as when calculated from the other side of the transformer, as would be expected.

Another useful tool for analyzing transformers is to have the base change formula that allows the engineer to go from a base impedance with one set of a base voltage and base power to another base impedance for a different set of a base voltage and base power. This becomes especially useful in real life applications where a transformer with a secondary side voltage of 1.2 kV might be connected to the primary side of another transformer whose rated voltage is 1 kV. The formula is as shown below.

$$\begin{align}
Z_\text{pu,new}&=Z_\text{pu,old} \times \frac{Z_\text{base,old}}{Z_\text{base,new}}=Z_\text{pu,old} \times \left(\frac{V_\text{base,old}}{V_\text{base,new}}\right)^2\times\left(\frac{S_\text{base,new}}{S_\text{base,old}}\right)\\
\end{align}$$
