= Acceleration due to gravity =

Acceleration due to gravity, acceleration of gravity or gravitational acceleration may refer to:

- Gravitational acceleration, the acceleration caused by the gravitational attraction of massive bodies in general
- Gravity of Earth, the acceleration caused by the combination of gravitational attraction and centrifugal force of the Earth
- Standard gravity, or g, the standard value of gravitational acceleration at sea level on Earth

== See also ==
- g-force, the acceleration of a body relative to free-fall
