= Free-air gravity anomaly =

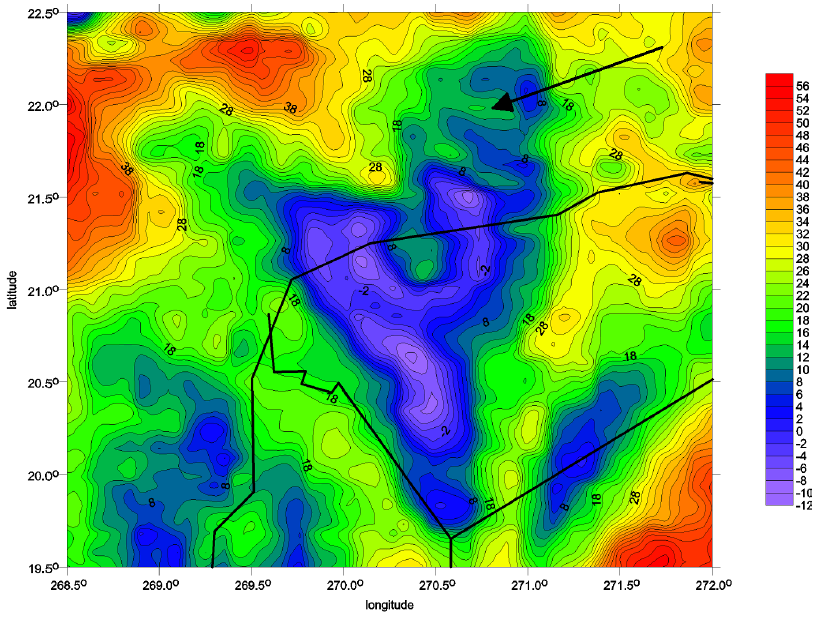
Circular free-air gravity anomaly over the Chicxulub Crater

In geophysics, the free-air gravity anomaly, often simply called the free-air anomaly, is the measured gravity anomaly after a free-air correction is applied to account for the elevation at which a measurement is made. It does so by adjusting these measurements of gravity to what would have been measured at a reference level, which is commonly taken as mean sea level or the geoid.

== Applications ==
Studies of the subsurface structure and composition of the Earth's crust and mantle employ surveys using gravimeters to measure the departure of observed gravity from a theoretical gravity value to identify anomalies due to geologic features below the measurement locations. The computation of anomalies from observed measurements involves the application of corrections that define the resulting anomaly. The free-air anomaly can be used to test for isostatic equilibrium over broad regions.

== Survey methods ==
The free-air correction adjusts measurements of gravity to what would have been measured at mean sea level, that is, on the geoid. The gravitational attraction of Earth below the measurement point and above mean sea level is ignored and it is imagined that the observed gravity is measured in air, hence the name. The theoretical gravity value at a location is computed by representing the Earth as an ellipsoid that approximates the more complex shape of the geoid. Gravity is computed on the ellipsoid surface using the International Gravity Formula.

For studies of subsurface structure, the free-air anomaly is further adjusted by a correction for the mass below the measurement point and above the reference of mean sea level or a local datum elevation. This defines the Bouguer anomaly.

== Calculation ==
The free-air gravity anomaly $g_F$ is given by the equation:

$$g_{F} = (g_{obs} + \delta g_F) - g_\lambda$$

Here, $g_{obs}$ is observed gravity, $\delta g_F$ is the free-air correction, and $g_\lambda$ is theoretical gravity.

It can be helpful to think of the free-air anomaly as comparing observed gravity to theoretical gravity adjusted up to the measurement point instead of observed gravity adjusted down to the geoid. This avoids any confusion of assuming that the measurement is made in free air. Either way, however, the Earth mass between the observation point and the geoid is neglected. The equation for this approach is simply rearranging terms in the first equation of this section so that reference gravity is adjusted and not the observed gravity:

$$g_{F} = g_{obs} - (g_\lambda - \delta g_F)$$

=== Correction ===
Gravitational acceleration decreases as an inverse square law with the distance at which the measurement is made from the mass. The free air correction is calculated from Newton's Law, as a rate of change of gravity with distance:

$$\begin{align} g &=\frac{GM}{R^2}\\
\frac{dg}{dR} &= -\frac{2GM}{R^3}= -\frac{2g}{R} \end{align}$$

At 45° latitude, $2g/R = 0.3086$ mGal/m.

The free-air correction is the amount that must be added to a measurement at height $h$ to correct it to the reference level:

$$\delta g_F = \frac{2g}{R} \times h$$

Here we have assumed that measurements are made relatively close to the surface so that R does not vary significantly. The value of the free-air correction is positive when measured above the geoid, and negative when measured below. There is the assumption that no mass exists between the observation point and the reference level. The Bouguer and terrain corrections are used to account for this.

== Significance ==
Over the ocean where gravity is measured from ships near sea level, there is no or little free-air correction. In marine gravity surveys, it was observed that the free-air anomaly is positive but very small over the Mid-Ocean Ridges in spite of the fact that these features rise several kilometers above the surrounding seafloor. The small anomaly is explained by the lower density crust and mantle below the ridges resulting from seafloor spreading. This lower density is an apparent offset to the extra height of the ridge indicating that Mid-Ocean Ridges are in isostatic equilibrium.

== See also ==
- Earth's gravity
- Reference ellipsoid
- WGS84
