= Gravitation of the Moon =

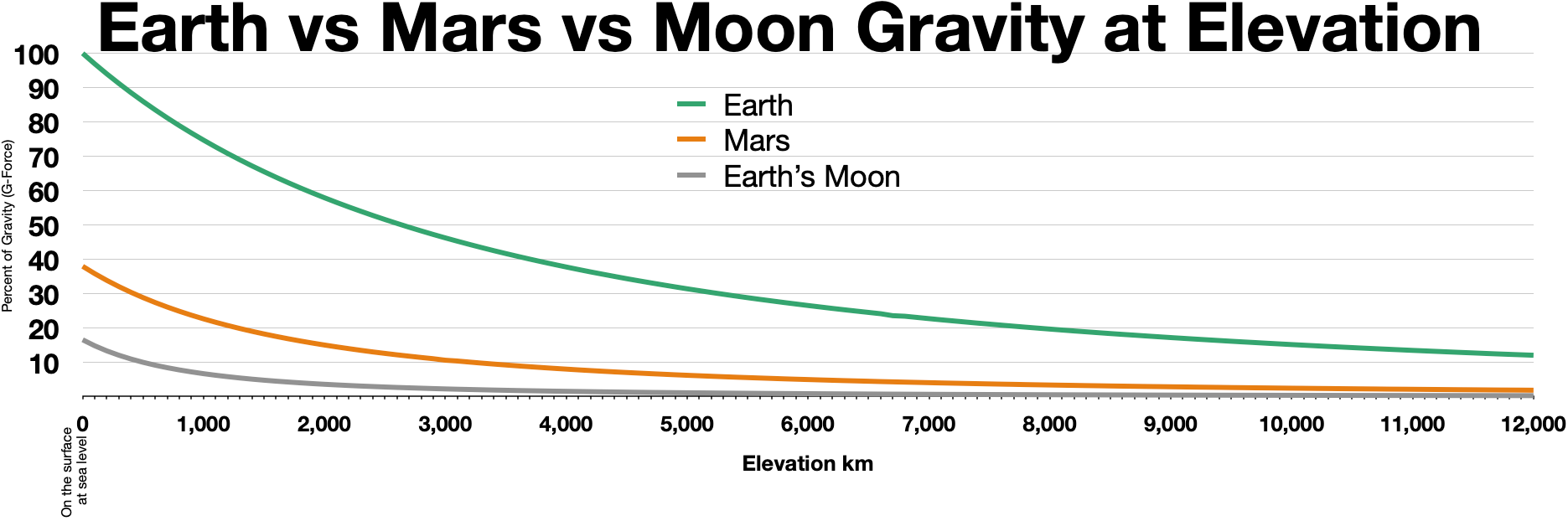
Earth vs Mars vs Moon gravity at elevation

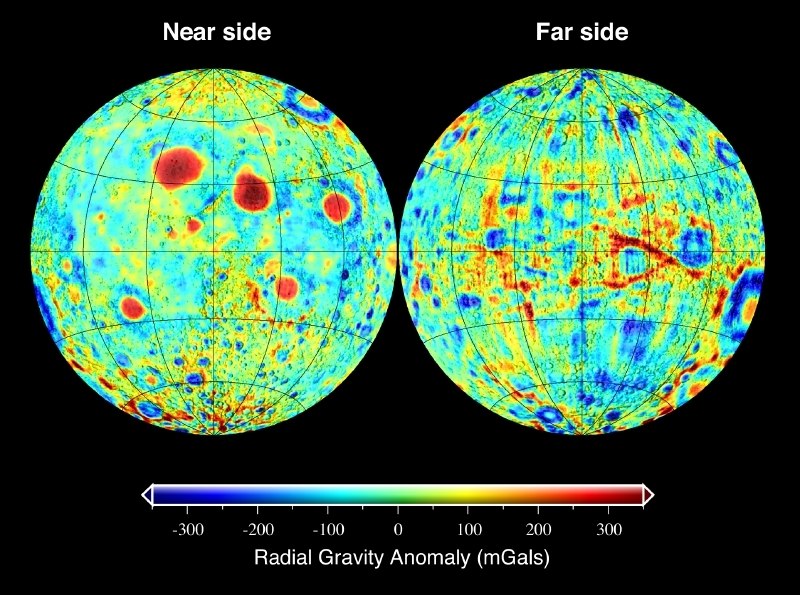
Rad gravity anomaly at the surface of the Moon in mGal

The acceleration due to gravity on the surface of the Moon is approximately 1.625 m/s^{2}, about 16.6% that on Earth's surface or 0.166 ɡ. Over the entire surface, the variation in gravitational acceleration is about 0.0253 m/s^{2} (1.6% of the acceleration due to gravity). Because weight is directly dependent upon gravitational acceleration, things on the Moon will weigh only 16.6% (= 1/6) of what they weigh on the Earth.

== Gravitational field ==
The gravitational field of the Moon has been measured by tracking the radio signals emitted by orbiting spacecraft. The principle used depends on the Doppler effect, whereby the line-of-sight spacecraft acceleration can be measured by small shifts in frequency of the radio signal, and the measurement of the distance from the spacecraft to a station on Earth. Since the gravitational field of the Moon affects the orbit of a spacecraft, one can use this tracking data to detect gravity anomalies.

Most low lunar orbits are unstable. Detailed data collected has shown that for low lunar orbit the only "stable" orbits are at inclinations near 27°, 50°, 76°, and 86°. Because of the Moon's synchronous rotation it is not possible to track spacecraft from Earth much beyond the limbs of the Moon, so until the recent Gravity Recovery and Interior Laboratory (GRAIL) mission the far-side gravity field was not well mapped.

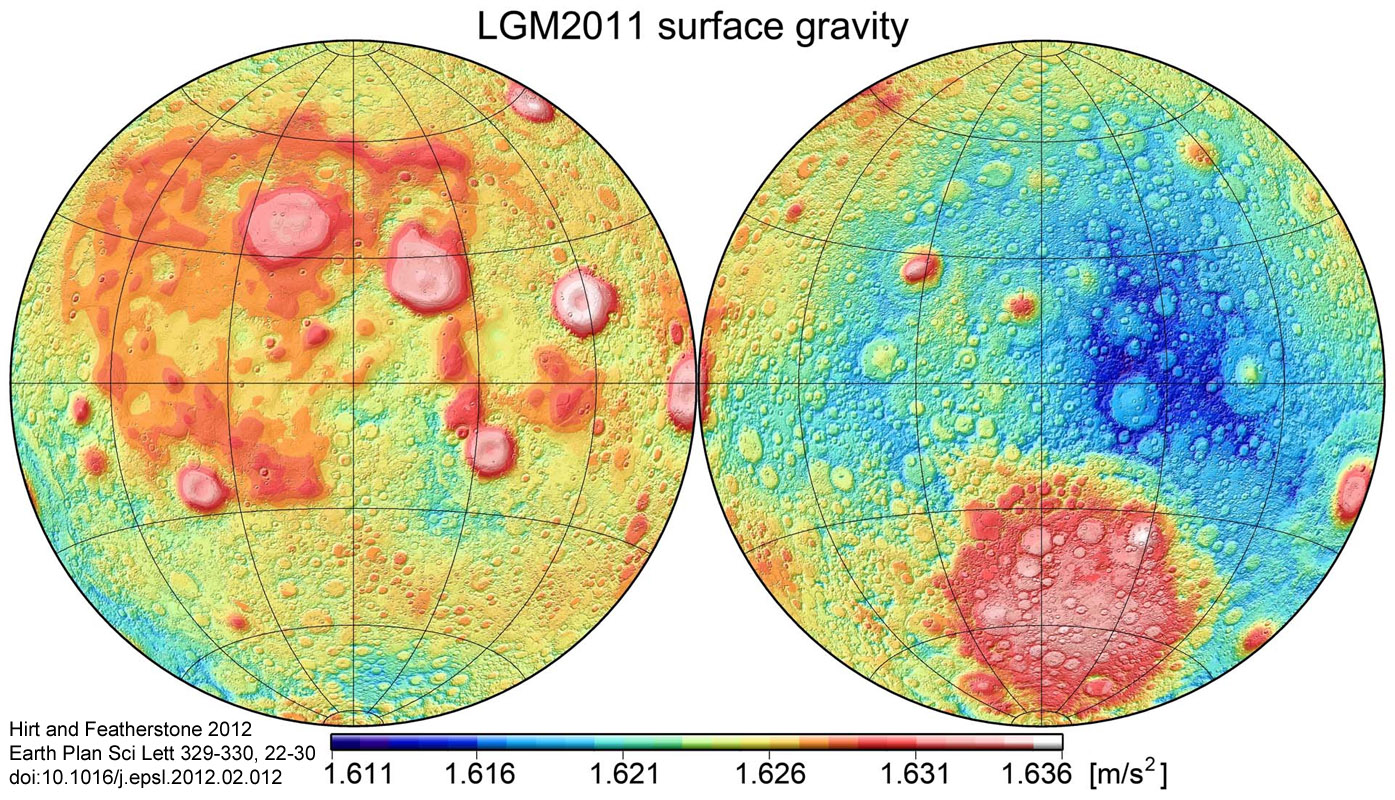
Gravity acceleration at the surface of the Moon in m/s^{2}. Near side on the left, far side on the right. Map from Lunar Gravity Model 2011.

The missions with accurate Doppler tracking that have been used for deriving gravity fields are in the accompanying table. The table gives the mission spacecraft name, a brief designation, the number of mission spacecraft with accurate tracking, the country of origin, and the time span of the Doppler data. Apollos 15 and 16 released subsatellites. The Kaguya/SELENE mission had tracking between 3 satellites to get far-side tracking. GRAIL had very accurate tracking between 2 spacecraft and tracking from Earth.

Missions Used for Lunar Gravity
Mission	ID	Number	Source	Years
Lunar Orbiter 1	LO1	1	US	1966
Lunar Orbiter 2	LO2	1	US	1966–1967
Lunar Orbiter 3	LO3	1	US	1967
Lunar Orbiter 4	LO4	1	US	1967
Lunar Orbiter 5	LO5	1	US	1967–1968
Apollo 15 Subsatellite	A15	1	US	1971–1972
Apollo 16 Subsatellite	A16	1	US	1972
Clementine	Cl	1	US	1994
Lunar Prospector	LP	1	US	1998–1999
Kaguya/SELENE	K/S	3	Japan	2007–2009
Chang'e 1	Ch1	1	China	2007–2009
GRAIL	G	2	US	2012
Chang'e 5T1	Ch1T1	1	China	2015–2018

The accompanying table below lists lunar gravity fields. The table lists the designation of the gravity field, the highest degree and order, a list of mission IDs that were analyzed together, and a citation. Mission ID LO includes all 5 Lunar Orbiter missions. The GRAIL fields are very accurate; other missions are not combined with GRAIL.

Lunar Gravity Fields
Designation	Degree	Mission IDs	Citation
LP165P	165	LO A15 A16 Cl LP	
GLGM3	150	LO A15 A16 Cl LP	
CEGM01	50	Ch 1	
SGM100h	100	LO A15 A16 Cl LP K/S	
SGM150J	150	LO A15 A16 Cl LP K/S	
CEGM02	100	LO A15 A16 Cl LP K/S Ch1	
GL0420A	420	G	
GL0660B	660	G	
GRGM660PRIM	660	G	
GL0900D	900	G	
GRGM900C	900	G	
GRGM1200A	1200	G	
CEGM03	100	LO A15 A16 Cl LP Ch1 K/S Ch5T1	

A major feature of the Moon's gravitational field is the presence of mascons, which are large positive gravity anomalies associated with some of the giant impact basins. These anomalies significantly influence the orbit of spacecraft around the Moon, and an accurate gravitational model is necessary in the planning of both crewed and uncrewed missions. They were initially discovered by the analysis of Lunar Orbiter tracking data: navigation tests prior to the Apollo program showed positioning errors much larger than mission specifications.

Mascons are in part due to the presence of dense mare basaltic lava flows that fill some of the impact basins. However, lava flows by themselves cannot fully explain the gravitational variations, and uplift of the crust-mantle interface is required as well. Based on Lunar Prospector gravitational models, it has been suggested that some mascons exist that do not show evidence for mare basaltic volcanism. The huge expanse of mare basaltic volcanism associated with Oceanus Procellarum does not cause a positive gravity anomaly. The center of gravity of the Moon does not coincide exactly with its geometric center, but is displaced toward the Earth by about 2 kilometers.

Moon – Oceanus Procellarum ("Ocean of Storms")

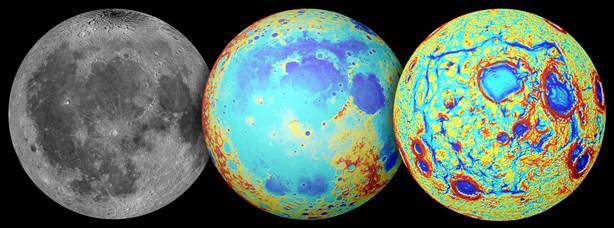
Ancient rift valleys – rectangular structure (visible – topography – GRAIL gravity gradients) (October 1, 2014).

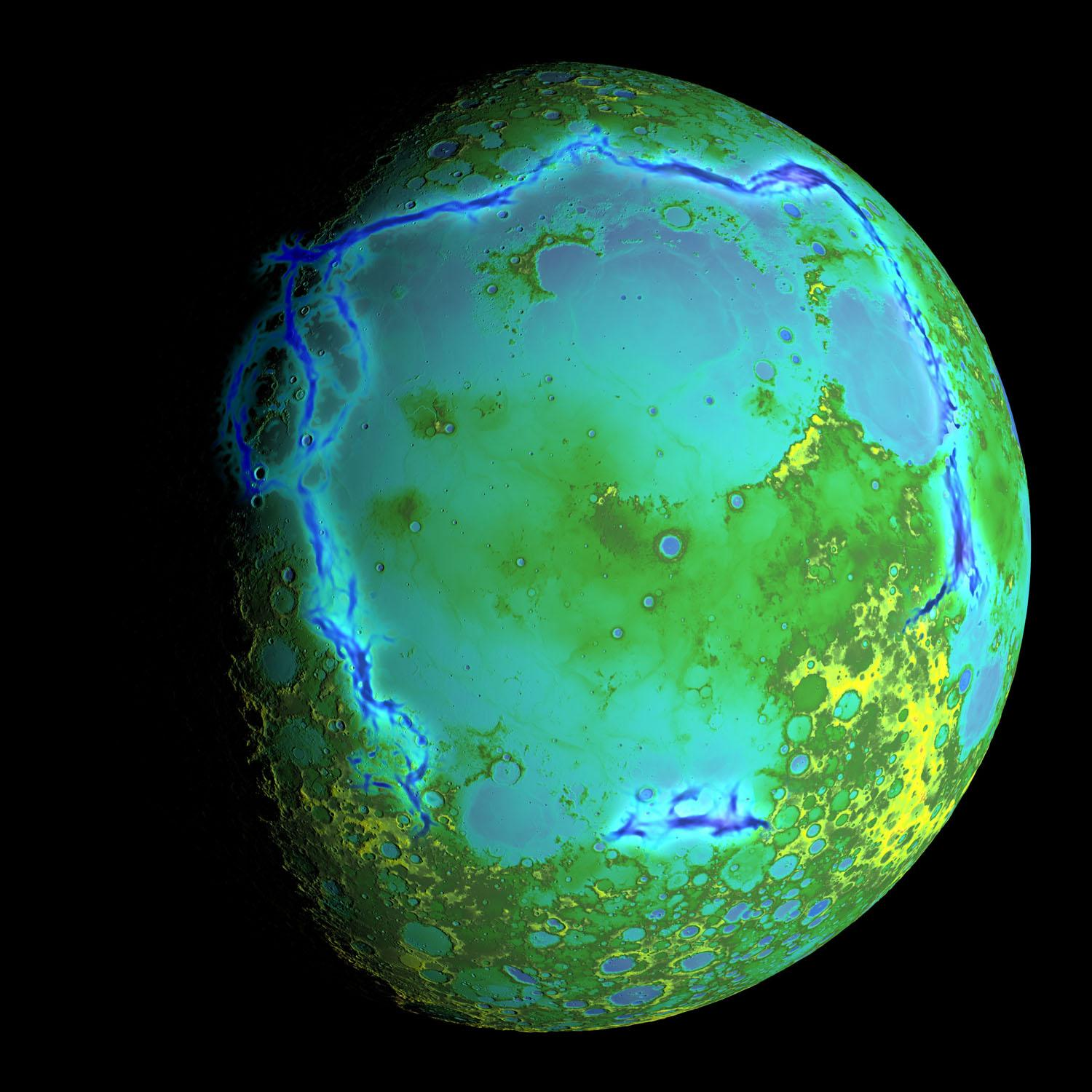
Ancient rift valleys – context.

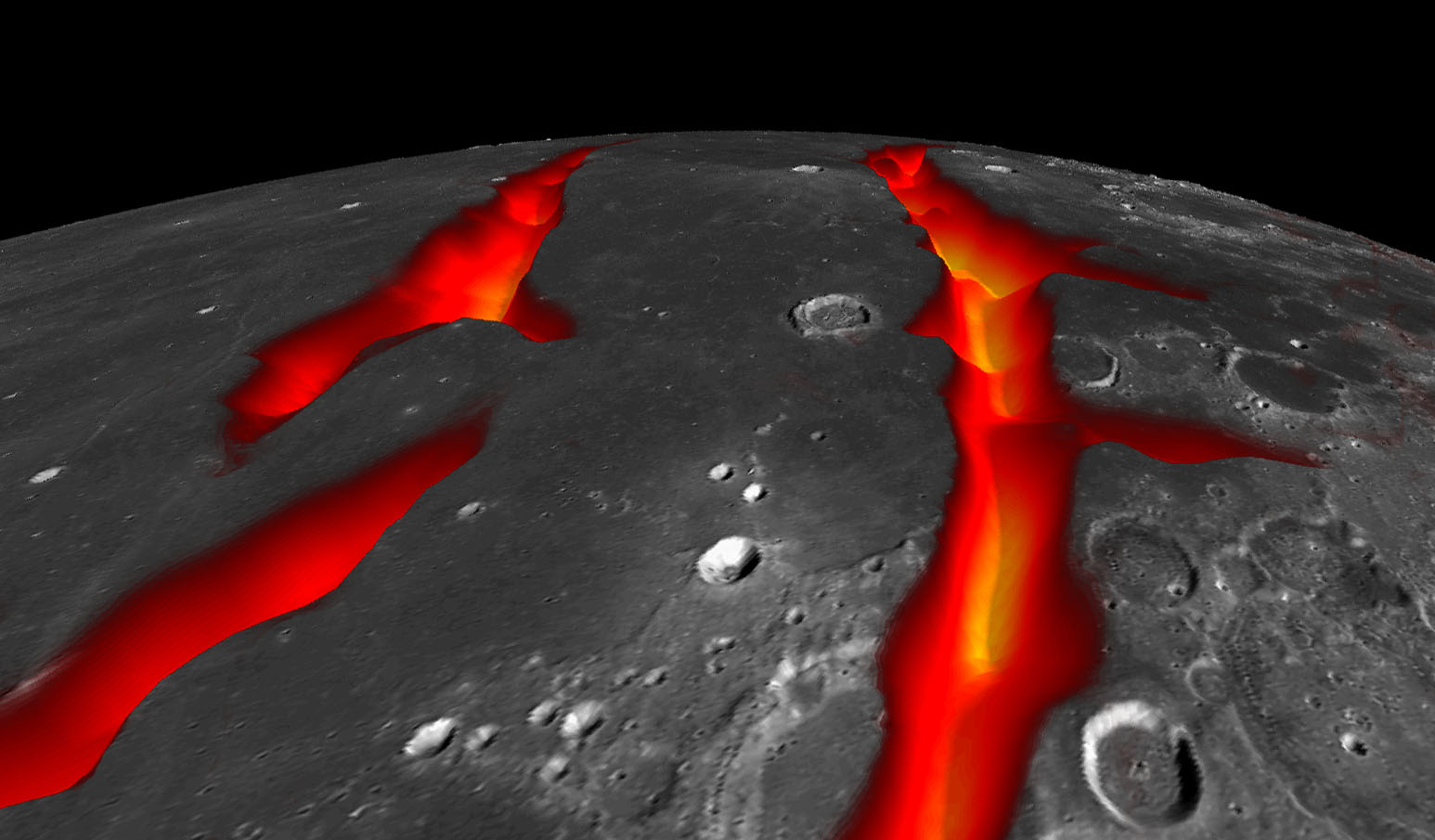
Ancient rift valleys – closeup (artist's concept).

== Mass of Moon ==
The gravitational constant G is less accurate than the product of G and masses for Earth and Moon. Consequently, it is conventional to express the lunar mass M multiplied by the gravitational constant G. The lunar GM = 4902.8001 km^{3}/s^{2} from GRAIL analyses. The mass of the Moon is M = 7.3458 × 10^{22} kg and the mean density is 3346 kg/m^{3}. The lunar GM is 1/81.30057 of the Earth's GM.

== Theory ==
For the lunar gravity field, it is conventional to use an equatorial radius of R = 1738.0 km. The gravity potential is written with a series of spherical harmonic functions P_{nm}. The gravitational potential V at an external point is conventionally expressed as positive in astronomy and geophysics, but negative in physics. Then, with the former sign,

$$V = \left ( \frac{GM}{r} \right )- \left ( \frac{GM}{r} \right ) \sum \left ( \frac{R}{r} \right )^n  J_n P_{n,0} (\sin \phi) + \left ( \frac{GM}{r} \right ) \sum \left ( \frac{R}{r} \right )^n [C_{n,m} P_{n,m}(\sin \phi) \cos(m \lambda) + S_{n,m}P_{n,m} (\sin \phi) \sin(m \lambda) ]$$

where r is the radius to an external point with r ≥ R, φ is the latitude of the external point, and λ is the east longitude of the external point. Note that the spherical harmonic functions P_{nm} can be normalized or unnormalized affecting the gravity coefficients J_{n}, C_{nm}, and S_{nm}. Here we will use unnormalized functions and compatible coefficients. The P_{n0} are called Legendre polynomials and the P_{nm} with m≠0 are called the Associated Legendre polynomials, where subscript n is the degree, m is the order, and m ≤ n. The sums start at n = 2. The unnormalized degree-2 functions are

$$\begin{align}
P_{2,0} &= \frac{3}{2} \sin^2 \!\phi - \frac{1}{2} \\[1ex]
P_{2,1} &= 3 \sin \phi \cos \phi \\[1ex]
P_{2,2} &= 3 \cos^2 \phi
\end{align}$$

Note that of the three functions, only P_{20}(±1)=1 is finite at the poles. More generally, only P_{n0}(±1)=1 are finite at the poles.

The gravitational acceleration of vector position r is

$$\begin{align}
\frac{d^2 r}{dt^2} &= \nabla V \\[1ex]
&= {\partial V \over \partial r} e_r + \frac{1}{r} {\partial V \over \partial \phi} e_\phi + \frac{1}{r \cos \phi} {\partial V \over \partial \lambda} {e_\lambda}
\end{align}$$

where e_{r}, e_{φ}, and e_{λ} are unit vectors in the three directions.

== Gravity coefficients ==
The unnormalized gravity coefficients of degree 2 and 3 that were determined by the GRAIL mission are given in Table 1. The zero values of C_{21}, S_{21}, and S_{22} are because a principal axis frame is being used. There are no degree-1 coefficients when the three axes are centered on the center of mass.

Lunar Gravity Coefficients
nm	J_{n}	C_{nm}	S_{nm}
20	203.3 × 10^{−6}	—	—
21	—	0	0
22	—	22.4 × 10^{−6}	0
30	8.46 × 10^{−6}	—	—
31	—	28.48 × 10^{−6}	5.89 × 10^{−6}
32	—	4.84 × 10^{−6}	1.67 × 10^{−6}
33	—	1.71 × 10^{−6}	−0.25 × 10^{−6}

The J_{2} coefficient for an oblate shape to the gravity field is affected by rotation and solid-body tides whereas C_{22} is affected by solid-body tides. Both are larger than their equilibrium values showing that the upper layers of the Moon are strong enough to support elastic stress. The C_{31} coefficient is large.

== Simulating lunar gravity ==
In January 2022 China was reported by the South China Morning Post to have built a small (60 centimeters in diameter) research facility to simulate low lunar gravity with the help of magnets. The facility was reportedly partly inspired by the work of Andre Geim (who later shared the 2010 Nobel Prize in Physics for his research on graphene) and Michael Berry, who both shared the Ig Nobel Prize in Physics in 2000 for the magnetic levitation of a frog.

== See also ==
- Magnetic field of the Moon
- Micro-g environment
