= Gravity map =

Map of a planet's gravity levels and anomalies

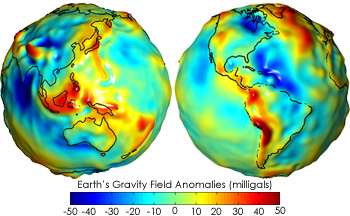
Earth Gravity Field Anomalies, geoid format, NASA Earth Observatory

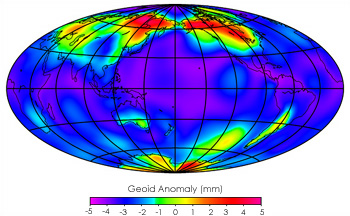
Earth Geoid Field Anomaly globe, NASA Earth Observatory

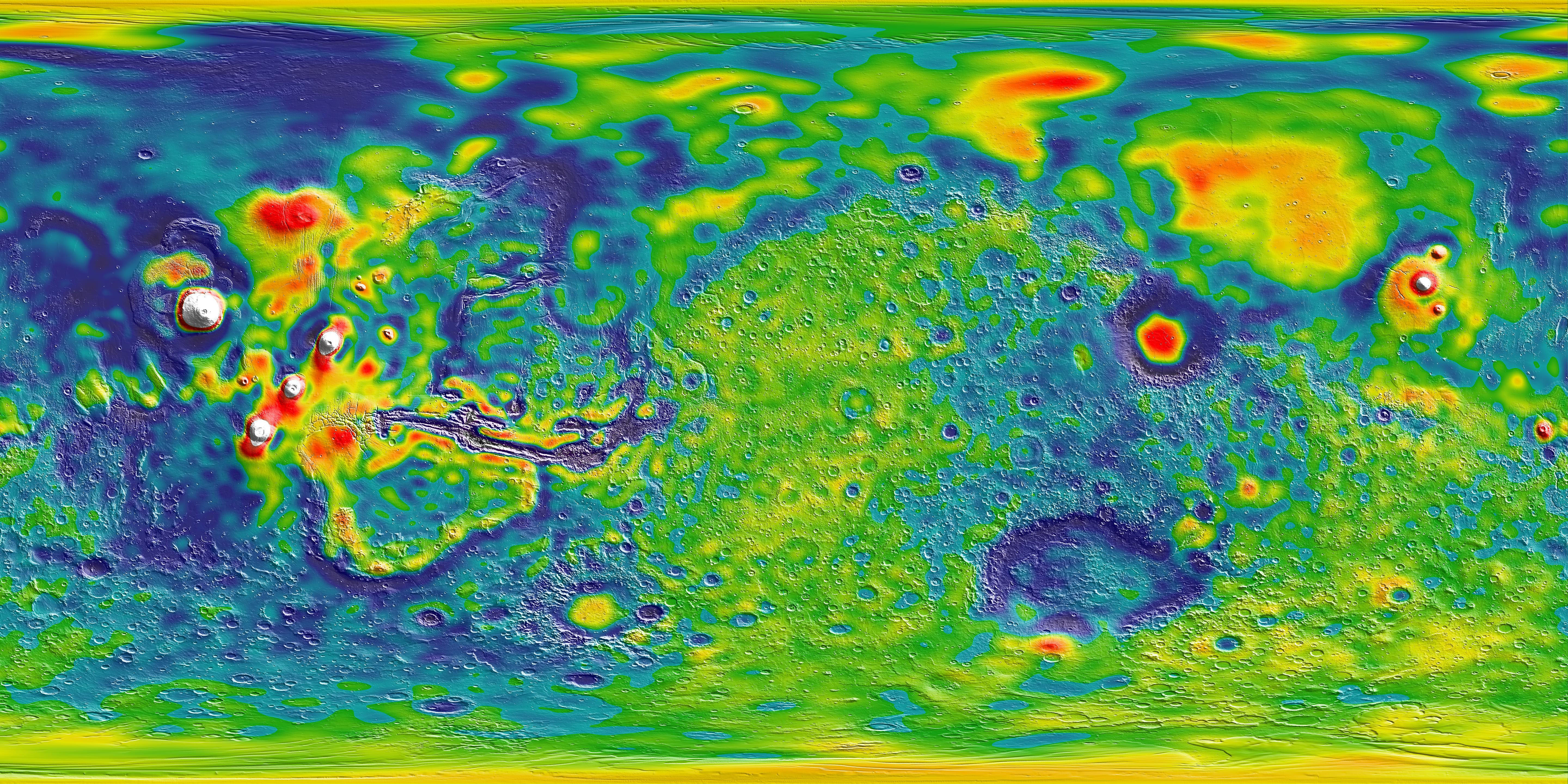
Mars free-air gravity map

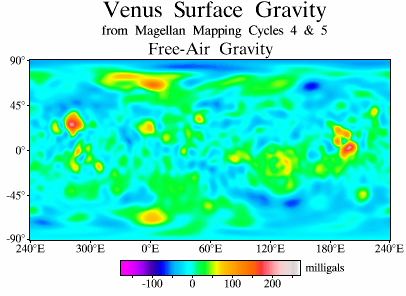
Venus gravity anomaly map

A gravity map is a map that depicts gravity measurements across an area of space, which are typically obtained via gravimetry. Gravity maps are an extension of the field of geodynamics. Readings are typically taken at regular intervals for surface analysis on Earth. Other methods include analysis of artificial satellite orbital mechanics, which can allow comprehensive gravity maps of planets, as has been done for Mars by NASA. Gravity maps typically are based on depictions of gravity anomalies or a planet's geoid.

== Creation of gravity maps ==
Measurements are typically taken via measuring ground stations with surveys conducted at regular intervals. For surface mapping of gravity, placement of instruments can be randomized. Surface gravity mapping is often used to map out gravity anomalies such as a Bouguer anomaly or isostatic gravity anomalies. Derivative gravity maps are an extension of standard gravity maps, involving mathematical analysis of the local gravitational field strength, to present data in analogous formats to a geological map. Gravity maps, in a "heat" context, typically represent intensity being representative of concentrations of mass in a given area, which correlates to that area having a stronger gravitational field; an example would be a mountain range. In the inverse, geological structures such as oceanic trenches or landmass depressions such as those caused by glaciers or fault lines will depict lower gravitational field values, due to the lower underlying amount of mass in the area.

Other methods include analysis of satellite orbital mechanics, which can allow comprehensive gravity maps of planets, as has been done for Mars by NASA. Goddard Mars Model (GMM) 3 is a gravity map of the gravitational field on the planet Mars. Three orbital craft over Mars, the Mars Global Surveyor (MGS), Mars Odyssey (ODY), and the Mars Reconnaissance Orbiter (MRO) assisted in the creation of the GMM 3 by the study of their orbital flight paths. Their travel times and the Doppler shift of radio communications between the respective craft and parabolic antennas belonging to the Deep Space Network, and incremental variations of the communication timing of radio signals and travel times of the craft allowed for the creation of an accurate GMM 3. The Martian gravity map was generated using more than sixteen years of data.
