= Gravitational field =

Vector field representing a mass's effect on surrounding space

Representation of the gravitational field of Earth and Moon combined (not to scale). Vector field (blue) and its associated scalar potential field (red). Point P between earth and moon is the point of equilibrium.

In physics, a gravitational field or gravitational acceleration field is a vector field used to explain the influences that a body extends into the space around itself. A gravitational field is used to explain gravitational phenomena, such as the gravitational force field exerted on another massive body. It has dimension of acceleration (L/T^{2}) and it is measured in units of newtons per kilogram (N/kg) or, equivalently, in meters per second squared (m/s^{2}).

In its original concept, gravity was a force between point masses. Following Isaac Newton, Pierre-Simon Laplace attempted to model gravity as some kind of radiation field or fluid, and since the 19th century, explanations for gravity in classical mechanics have usually been taught in terms of a field model, rather than a point attraction. It results from the spatial gradient of the gravitational potential field.

In general relativity, rather than two particles attracting each other, the particles distort spacetime via their mass, and this distortion is what is perceived and measured as a "force". In such a model one states that matter moves in certain ways in response to the curvature of spacetime, and that there is either no gravitational force, or that gravity is a fictitious force.

Gravity is distinguished from other forces by its obedience to the equivalence principle.

== Classical mechanics ==
Computer generated simulation of two bodies orbiting each other with plotted gravitational field

In classical mechanics, a gravitational field is a physical quantity. A gravitational field can be defined using Newton's law of universal gravitation. Determined in this way, the gravitational field g around a single particle of mass M is a vector field consisting at every point of a vector pointing directly towards the particle. The magnitude of the field at every point is calculated by applying the universal law, and represents the force per unit mass on any object at that point in space. Because the force field is conservative, there is a scalar potential energy per unit mass, Φ, at each point in space associated with the force fields; this is called gravitational potential. The gravitational field equation is
$$\mathbf{g}=\frac{\mathbf{F}}{m}=\frac{d^2\mathbf{R}}{dt^2}=-GM\frac{\mathbf{R}}{\left|\mathbf{R}\right|^3} = -\nabla\Phi ,$$
where F is the gravitational force, m is the mass of the test particle, R is the radial vector of the test particle relative to the mass (or for Newton's second law of motion which is a time dependent function, a set of positions of test particles each occupying a particular point in space for the start of testing), t is time, G is the gravitational constant, and ∇ is the del operator.

This includes Newton's law of universal gravitation, and the relation between gravitational potential and field acceleration. d^{2}R/dt^{2} and F/m are both equal to the gravitational acceleration g (equivalent to the inertial acceleration, so same mathematical form, but also defined as gravitational force per unit mass). The negative signs are inserted since the force acts antiparallel to the displacement. The equivalent field equation in terms of mass density ρ of the attracting mass is:
$$\nabla\cdot\mathbf{g}=-\nabla^2\Phi=-4\pi G\rho$$
which contains Gauss's law for gravity, and Poisson's equation for gravity. Newton's law implies Gauss's law, but not vice versa; see Relation between Gauss's and Newton's laws.

These classical equations are differential equations of motion for a test particle in the presence of a gravitational field, i.e. setting up and solving these equations allows the motion of a test mass to be determined and described.

The field around multiple particles is simply the vector sum of the fields around each individual particle. A test particle in such a field will experience a force that equals the vector sum of the forces that it would experience in these individual fields. This is
$$\mathbf{g}
= \sum_{i}\mathbf{g}_i
= \frac{1}{m}\sum_{i}\mathbf{F}_i
= - G\sum_{i}m_i\frac{\mathbf{R}-\mathbf{R}_i}{\left|\mathbf{R}-\mathbf{R}_i\right|^3}
= - \sum_{i}\nabla\Phi_i ,$$
i.e. the gravitational field on mass m_{j} is the sum of all gravitational fields due to all other masses m_{i}, except the mass m_{j} itself. R_{i} is the position vector of the gravitating particle i, and R is that of the test particle.

== General relativity ==
A freely moving particle in gravitational field has the equations of motion:
$$\frac{d^2x^\lambda}{d\tau^2} + \Gamma^\lambda_{\mu\nu}\frac{dx^\mu}{d\tau}\frac{dx^\nu}{d\tau} = 0$$
where $\tau$ is the proper time for the particle, $\Gamma^\lambda_{\mu\nu}$ are the Christoffel symbols and repeated indices are summed over. The proper time can be expressed in terms of the metric tensor:
$$d\tau^2 = -g_{\mu\nu} dx^\mu dx^\nu.$$
The field that determines the gravitational force is the Christoffel symbols and its derivatives, the metric tensor plays the role of the gravitational potential.

In general relativity, the gravitational field is determined by solving the Einstein field equations
$$\mathbf{G} = \kappa \mathbf{T} ,$$
where T is the stress–energy tensor, G is the Einstein tensor, and κ is the Einstein gravitational constant. The latter is defined as κ = 8πG/c^{4}, where G is the Newtonian constant of gravitation and c is the speed of light.

These equations are dependent on the distribution of matter, stress and momentum in a region of space, unlike Newtonian gravity, which depends on only the distribution of matter. The fields themselves in general relativity represent the curvature of spacetime. General relativity states that being in a region of curved space is equivalent to accelerating up the gradient of the field. By Newton's second law, this will cause an object to experience a fictitious force if it is held still with respect to the field. This is why a person will feel themself pulled down by the force of gravity while standing still on the Earth's surface. In general the gravitational fields predicted by general relativity differ in their effects only slightly from those predicted by classical mechanics, but there are a number of easily verifiable differences, one of the most well known being the deflection of light in such fields.

== Embedding diagram ==
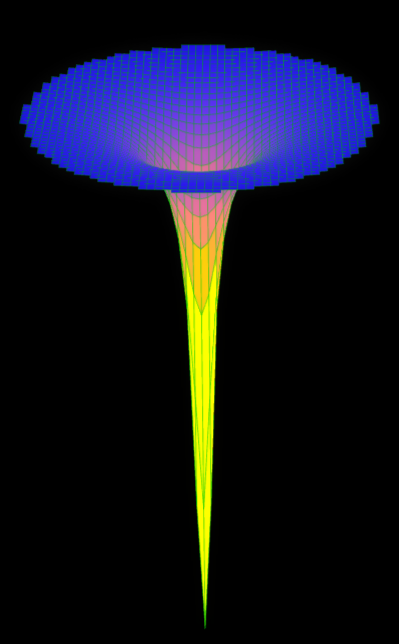
Gravitational well of a point mass

Embedding diagrams are three dimensional graphs commonly used to educationally illustrate gravitational potential by drawing gravitational potential fields as a gravitational topography, depicting the potentials as so-called gravitational wells, sphere of influence.

== See also ==
- Classical mechanics
- Entropic gravity
- Gravitation
- Gravitational energy
- Gravitational potential
- Gravitational wave
- Gravity map
- Newton's law of universal gravitation
- Newton's laws of motion
- Potential energy
- Specific force
- Speed of gravity
- Tests of general relativity
