= Mass distribution =

Spatial distribution of mass within a solid body

In physics and mechanics, mass distribution is the spatial distribution of mass within a solid body. In principle, it is relevant also for gases or liquids, but on Earth their mass distribution is almost homogeneous.

== Astronomy ==
In astronomy mass distribution has decisive influence on the development e.g. of nebulae, stars and planets. The mass distribution of a solid defines its center of gravity and influences its dynamical behaviour - e.g. the oscillations and eventual rotation.

== Mathematical modelling ==
A mass distribution can be modeled as a measure. This allows point masses, line masses, surface masses, as well as masses given by a volume density function. Alternatively the latter can be generalized to a distribution. For example, a point mass is represented by a delta function defined in 3-dimensional space. A surface mass on a surface given by the equation f (x, y, z) = 0 may be represented by a density distribution g(x, y, z) δ(f (x, y, z)), where $g/\left|\nabla f\right|$ is the mass per unit area.

The mathematical modelling can be done by potential theory, by numerical methods (e.g. a great number of mass points), or by theoretical equilibrium figures.

== Geology ==
In geology the aspects of rock density are involved.

== Rotating solids ==
Rotating solids are affected considerably by the mass distribution, either if they are homogeneous or inhomogeneous - see Torque, moment of inertia, wobble, imbalance and stability.

== See also ==
- Bouguer plate
- Gravity
- Mass function
- Mass concentration (astronomy)
