= Bouguer anomaly =

Type of gravity anomaly

In geodesy and geophysics, the Bouguer anomaly (named after Pierre Bouguer) is a gravity anomaly, corrected for the height at which it is measured and the attraction of terrain. The height correction alone gives a free-air gravity anomaly.

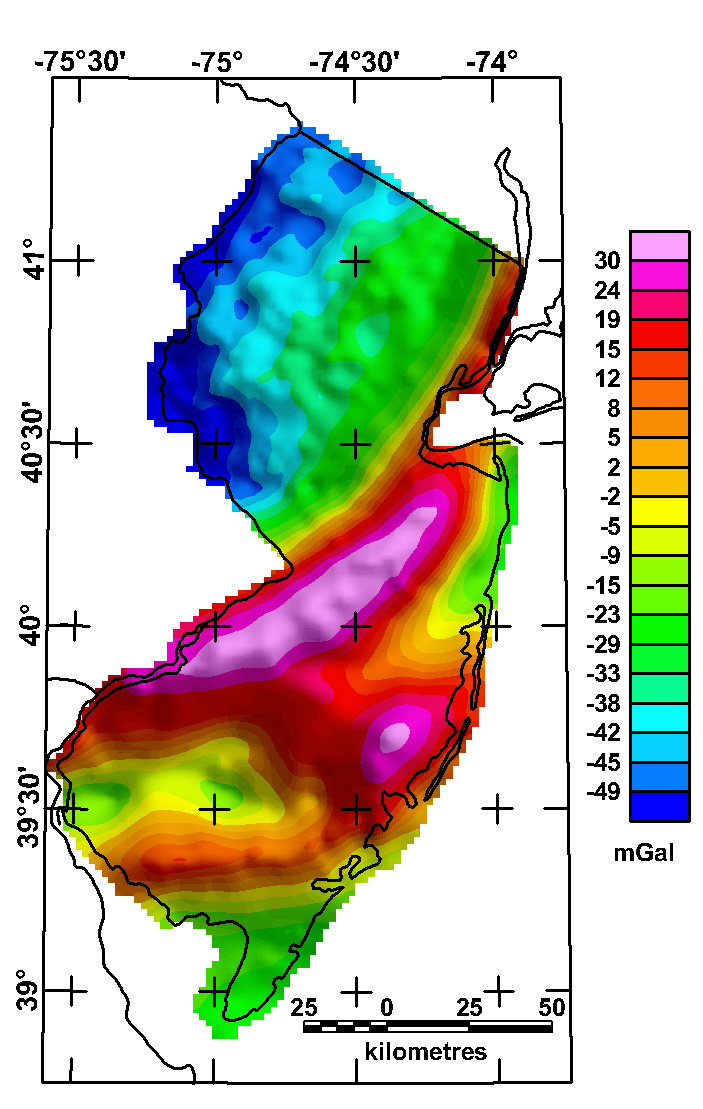
Bouguer anomaly map of the state of New Jersey (USGS)

== Definition ==
The Bouguer anomaly $g_B$ defined as:

$$g_B = g_{F} - \delta g_B + \delta g_T$$

Here,

- $g_F$ is the free-air gravity anomaly.
- $\delta g_B$ is the Bouguer correction which allows for the gravitational attraction of rocks between the measurement point and sea level;
- $\delta g_T$ is a terrain correction which allows for deviations of the surface from an infinite horizontal plane

The free-air anomaly $g_F$, in its turn, is related to the observed gravity $g_{obs}$ as follows:

$$g_F = g_{obs} - g_\lambda + \delta g_F$$

where:

- $g_\lambda$ is the correction for latitude (because the Earth is not a perfect sphere; see normal gravity);
- $\delta g_F$ is the free-air correction.

== Reduction ==
A Bouguer reduction is called simple (or incomplete) if the terrain is approximated by an infinite flat plate called the Bouguer plate. A refined (or complete) Bouguer reduction removes the effects of terrain more precisely. The difference between the two is called the (residual) terrain effect (or (residual) terrain correction) and is due to the differential gravitational effect of the unevenness of the terrain; it is always negative.

=== Simple reduction ===
The gravitational acceleration $g$ outside a Bouguer plate is perpendicular to the plate and towards it, with magnitude 2πG times the mass per unit area, where $G$ is the gravitational constant. It is independent of the distance to the plate (as can be proven most simply with Gauss's law for gravity, but can also be proven directly with Newton's law of gravity). The value of $G$ is 6.67×10^{−11} N m^{2} kg^{−2}, so $g$ is 4.191×10^{−10} N m^{2} kg^{−2} times the mass per unit area. Using 1 Gal = 0.01 m s^{−2} (1 cm s^{−2}) we get 4.191×10^{−5} mGal m^{2} kg^{−1} times the mass per unit area. For mean rock density (2.67 g cm^{−3}) this gives 0.1119 mGal m^{−1}

The Bouguer reduction for a Bouguer plate of thickness $H$ is
$$\delta g_B = 2\pi\rho G H$$
where $\rho$ is the density of the material and $G$ is the constant of gravitation. On Earth the effect on gravity of elevation is 0.3086 mGal m^{−1} decrease when going up, minus the gravity of the Bouguer plate, giving the Bouguer gradient of 0.1967 mGal m^{−1}.

More generally, for a mass distribution with the density depending on one Cartesian coordinate z only, gravity for any z is 2πG times the difference in mass per unit area on either side of this z value. A combination of two parallel infinite if equal mass per unit area plates does not produce any gravity between them.

== See also ==
- Gravity of Earth
- Gravity map
- Physical geodesy – Study of the physical properties of the Earth's gravity field
- Potential theory – Harmonic functions as solutions to Laplace's equation
- Vertical deflection – Measure of the downward gravitational force's shift due to nearby mass
