= 2021 British Grand Prix =

10th round of the 2021 Formula One World Championship

Race 10 of 22 (Note: At the time of the event Formula One planned to hold twenty-three Grands Prix.) in the 2021 Formula One World Championship
← Previous race	Next race →
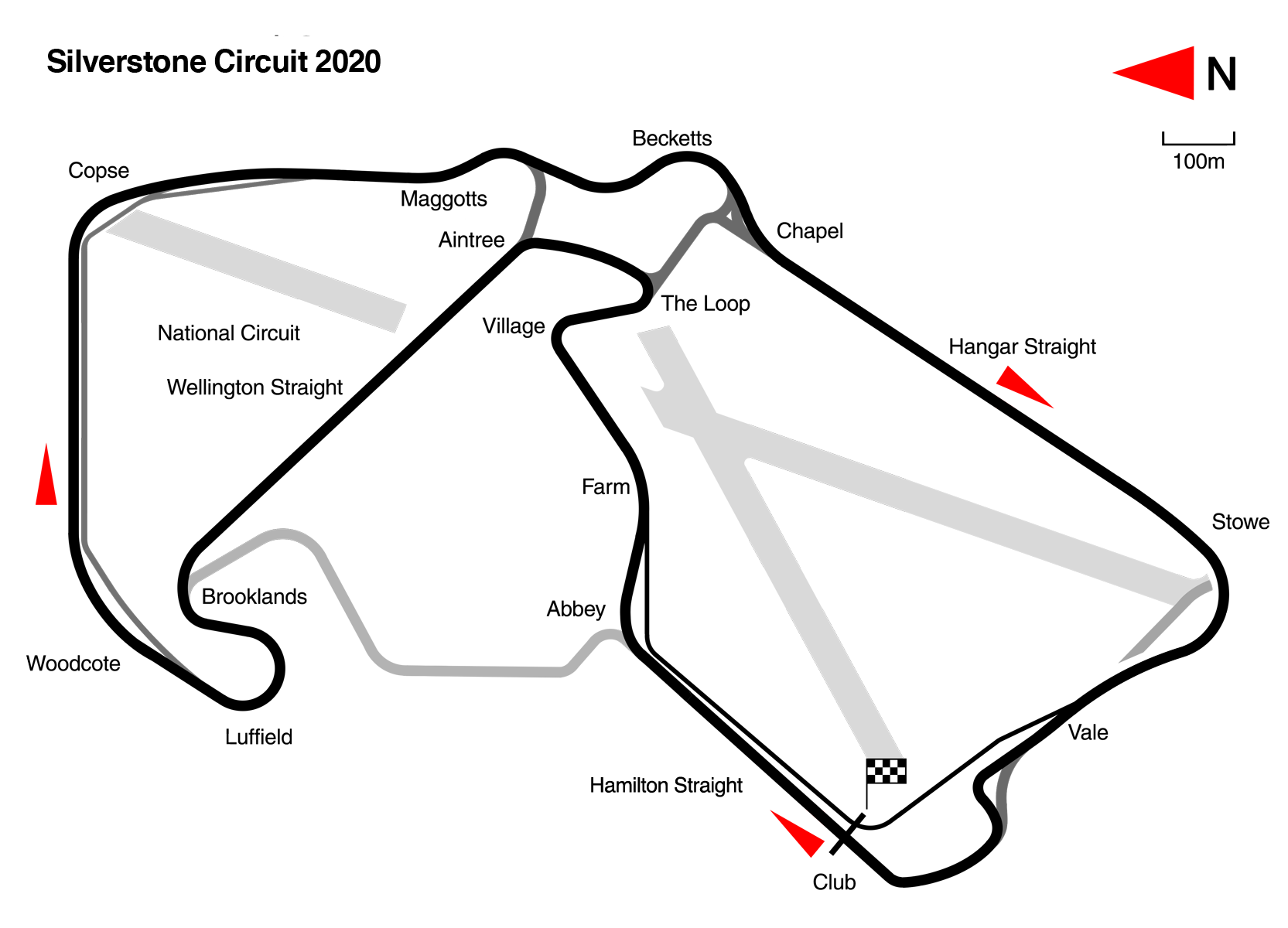
- Layout of the Silverstone Circuit

Race details
- Date: 18 July 2021
- Official name: Formula 1 Pirelli British Grand Prix 2021
- Location: Silverstone Circuit; Silverstone, United Kingdom
- Course: Permanent racing facility
- Course length: 5.891 km (3.660 miles)
- Distance: 52 laps, 306.198 km (190.263 miles)
- Weather: Clear. Ambient: 29 to 31 °C (84 to 88 °F); Surface: 48 to 52 °C (118 to 126 °F)
- Attendance: 356,000 (race weekend); 140,000 (race)

Pole position
Driver	(Netherlands) Max Verstappen	Red Bull Racing-Honda
- Grid positions set by results of sprint qualifying

Fastest lap
Driver	(Mexico) Sergio Pérez	Red Bull Racing-Honda
- Time: 1:28.617 on lap 50

Podium
First	(United Kingdom) Lewis Hamilton	Mercedes
Second	(Monaco) Charles Leclerc	Ferrari
Third	(Finland) Valtteri Bottas	Mercedes

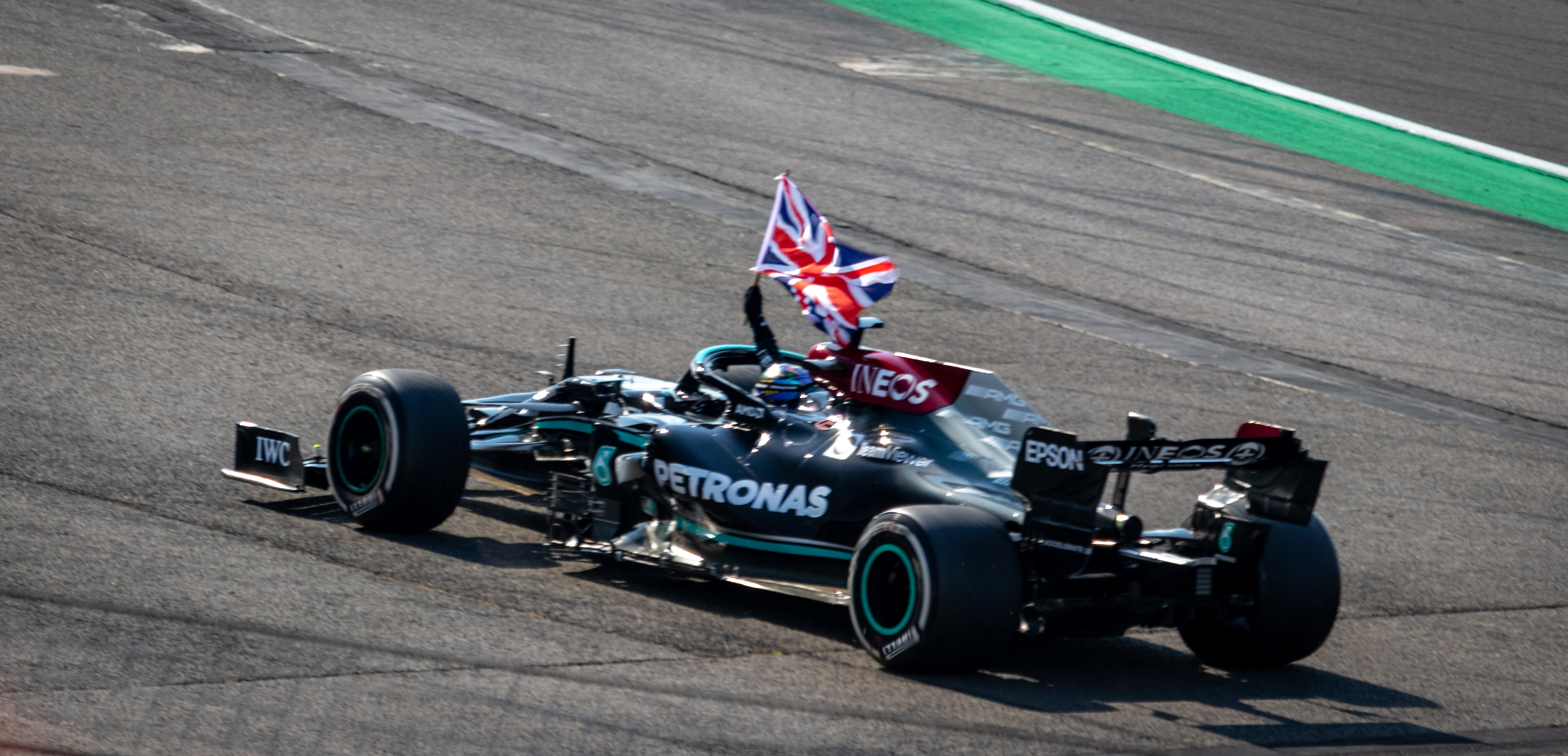
Lewis Hamilton waves the British flag after his victory

The 2021 British Grand Prix (officially known as the Formula 1 Pirelli British Grand Prix 2021 for sponsorship reasons) was a Formula One motor race held on 18 July 2021 at the Silverstone Circuit in Northamptonshire, England. It was the tenth round of the 2021 Formula One World Championship and also featured the first ever "sprint qualifying" event in F1 – a new format run on the Saturday of the race weekend over a distance of 100 kilometres (62 mi). Three points were awarded to the winner of the Sprint, two to second place and one to third place. The results of the sprint qualifying decided the grid for the race on Sunday.

Lewis Hamilton qualified the fastest for the sprint's starting grid, but championship rival Max Verstappen would win the sprint qualification, giving him pole position for the race. On the first lap of the race, Verstappen and Hamilton collided going into Copse corner, which took Verstappen out of race and earned Hamilton a ten-second time penalty for causing a collision. Hamilton recovered from the penalty to win the race from Charles Leclerc and Valtteri Bottas, achieving an eighth British Grand Prix win.

== Background ==
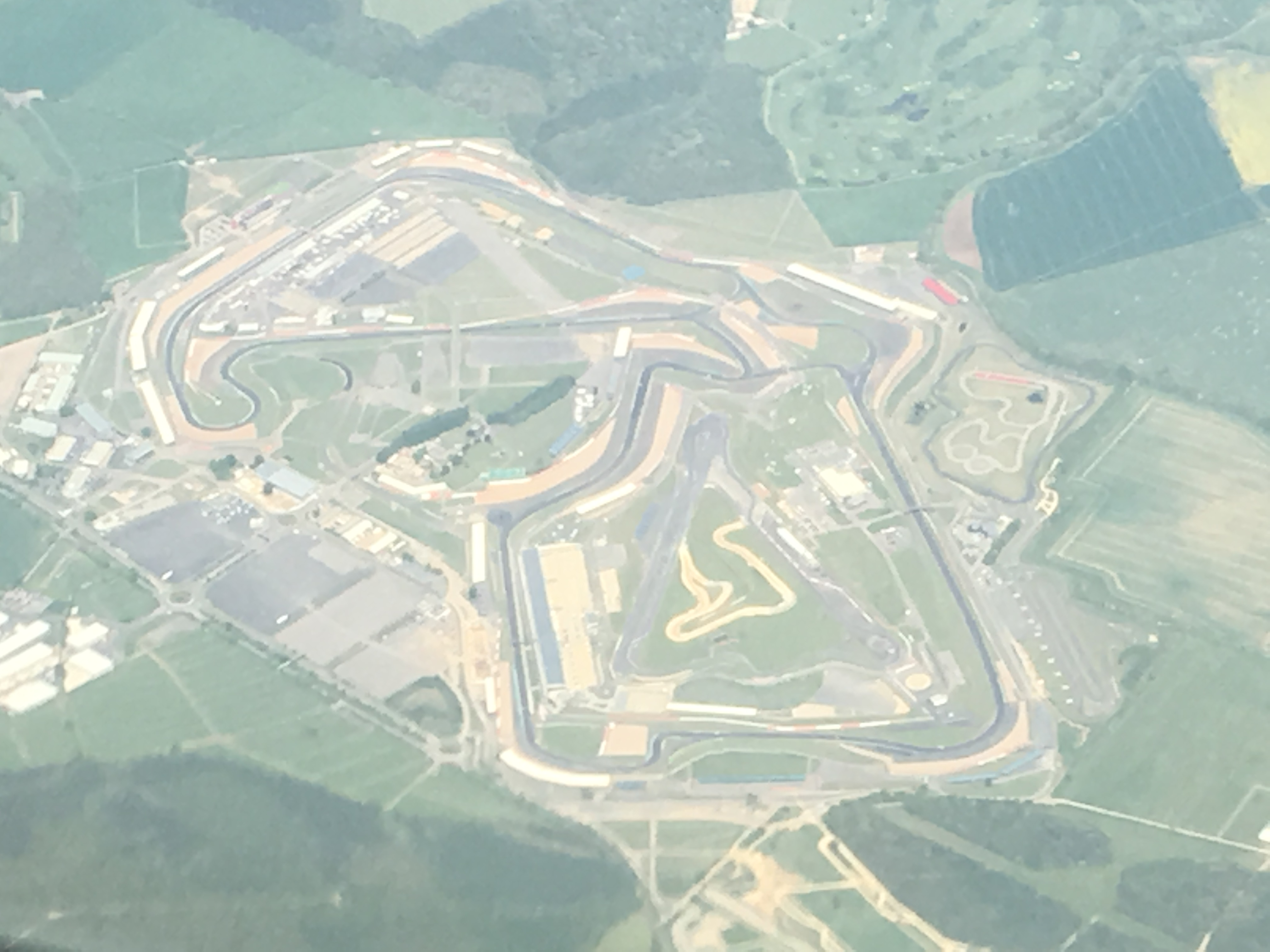
Aerial view of the Silverstone Circuit

The event, which was held over the weekend of 16–18 July, was the only Formula One race at Silverstone in 2021, after the venue had held two races behind closed doors due to the COVID-19 pandemic in the United Kingdom during 2020; the 2020 British Grand Prix was won by Lewis Hamilton, while the other one-off race, the 70th Anniversary Grand Prix, was won by Max Verstappen. This was the seventy-second time the British Grand Prix had formed a part of the world championship. In February 2021, the organisers at Silverstone Circuit said they hoped the race would have a capacity of a crowd of 140,000, but that this was dependent on the impact of the COVID-19 pandemic in the United Kingdom, which had forced the two races held at Silverstone in 2020 to be behind closed doors. Hamilton aimed to win the event for a record-breaking eighth time, having won the event seven times overall previously having first won the event in 2008 and going for his third consecutive British GP win having won the event the previous two seasons. The United Kingdom government allowed fans to return to live major sporting events on 17 May 2021 in limited numbers.

On 14 June 2021, the United Kingdom's government announced that a planned further easing of lockdown restrictions in England would be delayed from an original date of 21 June 2021 to 19 July 2021, a delay of four weeks and the day after the Silverstone race took place. This meant Silverstone would require special exemption to gain a capacity crowd and the circuit began work with the Department for Digital, Culture, Media and Sport to try and establish how many fans the venue would be allowed to host. On 24 June 2021, the British Grand Prix was given permission to take place with a full capacity crowd as a part of United Kingdom government's events research programme with ticket holders either required to provide evidence of negative lateral flow test carried out 48 hours before their attendance of the event or proof of double vaccination against the virus fourteen days before attending the first day of the event. Upon being asked for his reaction to news about Silverstone being permitted to have a capacity crowd, Hamilton said in a press conference prior to the Styrian Grand Prix that he feared allowing such big numbers of spectators to attend the event were "premature" but some of his fellow drivers, notably George Russell and Verstappen, were more positive about the news. Reportedly more of the spectators were women than in previous years.

On Thursday 15 July, one day prior to start of the weekend action, Lando Norris admitted in an interview to Craig Slater of Sky Sports his preparations for his home race were not ideal, stating he was "sore", "not in the perfect condition", and he was "struggling to get sleep" after he was mugged in an incident at Wembley Stadium after the UEFA Euro 2020 Final. Also on 15 July, McLaren made a statement confirming that three of their team had tested positive for COVID-19. Notably, chief executive officer Zak Brown was one of the three who were positive. Neither of the drivers had to self-isolate and the plans for the weekend were "unaffected." The event marked the seventieth anniversary of Scuderia Ferrari's first world championship Grand Prix win. A full-scale mock-up model illustrating what cars built to the planned 2022 aerodynamic regulations will look like was revealed at the venue on the Thursday before the Grand Prix.

Following the Austrian Grand Prix, Verstappen led the Drivers' Championship from Hamilton by 32 points, who leads third placed Sergio Pérez by 46 points. Red Bull Racing led Mercedes by 44 points in the Constructors' Championship. The drivers and teams were the same as the season entry list, with no additional stand-in drivers for the race. Sole tyre supplier Pirelli allocated the C1, C2, and C3 compounds of tyre to be used in the race. The weekend saw the race debut of new rear-tyre construction following a successful test in practice at the previous event in Austria. The new construction is designed to improve safety, by preventing rear-tyre failures, such as those experienced by Lance Stroll and Verstappen at the Azerbaijan Grand Prix earlier in the season.

=== Weekend format ===
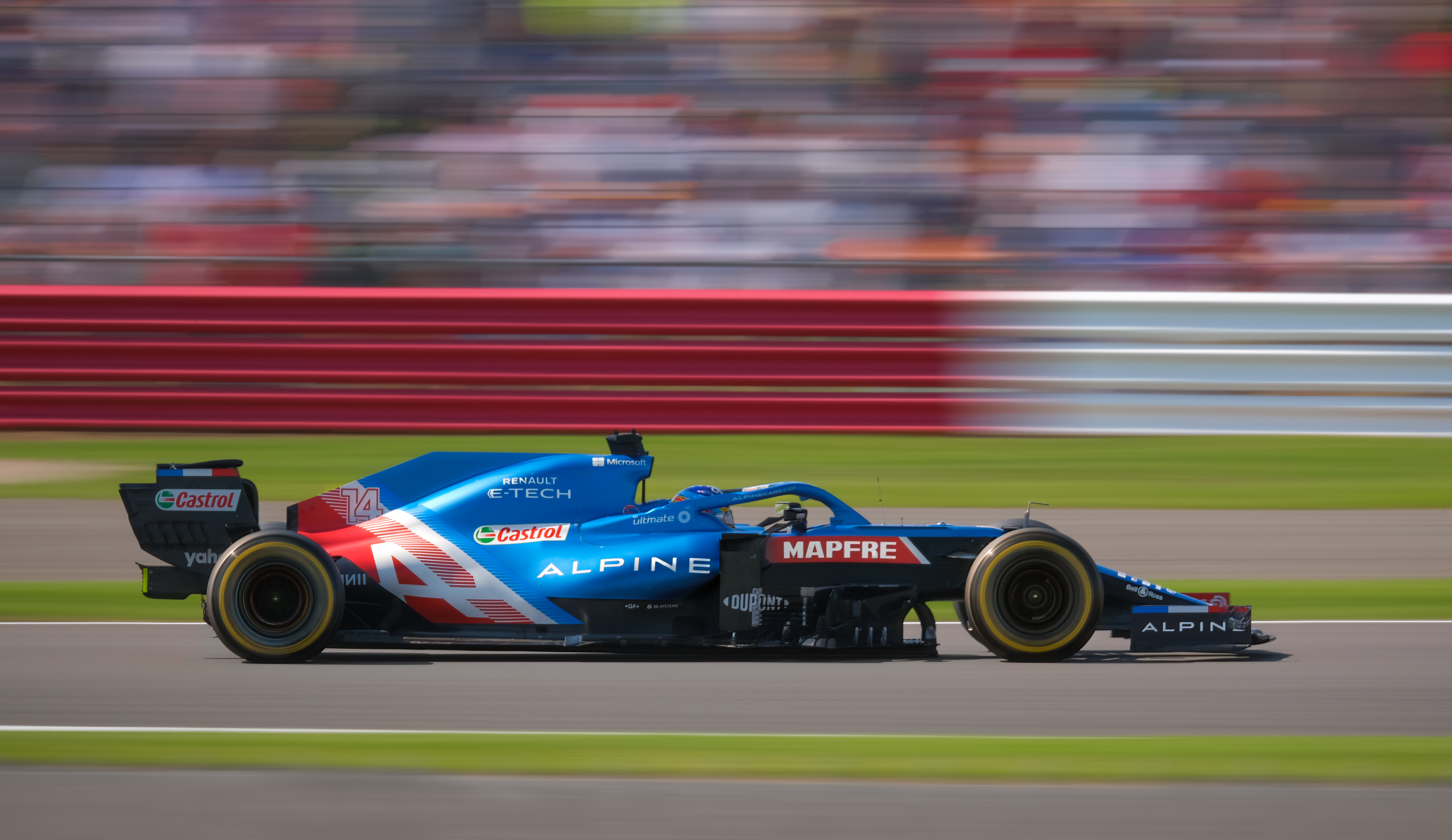
Fernando Alonso during Sunday's feature race. Prior to the weekend, he had reacted positively to the idea of the proposed sprint qualifying format.

The 2021 British Grand Prix was the first race in the season to implement the new sprint-qualifying format, with two others expected to do the same later in the season. It was agreed after the FIA, Formula One and all ten teams had reached a unanimous agreement, regarding the schedule of the weekend. This saw a change in the weekend format as well as the rules. Usually, Friday would host two practice sessions, one in the morning and the other in the afternoon. Saturday would have the final practice in the morning with qualifying in the afternoon. Sunday would have just one session, the 305 kilometres (190 mi) race. The sprint qualifying changes this format, and on a Friday there would be one practice session in the early afternoon and a traditional qualifying (to determine the sprint-qualifying starting order) in the evening. On a Saturday, the second practice would take place at noon, with a newly added sprint race happening in the afternoon. Sunday is unchanged in this format. This also meant that this was the first F1 weekend for many years with a Friday qualification season.

Formula One's director of data systems Rob Smedley said the sport would do the best it could to make sure that sprint-qualifying races do not become a "blur" for fans. Whilst ex-World Champion Sebastian Vettel has voiced his scepticism over the sprint-qualifying idea, drivers such as Hamilton, Carlos Sainz Jr., Fernando Alonso, and Russell have reacted positively with Formula One willingness to try a new format. Ferrari driver Charles Leclerc suggested the sprint-qualifying experiments should not continue in the future if they were proven to be unsuccessful. Leclerc also said he believed that sprint qualifying would enable drivers to push "for a whole race". Changes to sporting regulations to accommodate sprint qualifying were approved by teams prior to the Austrian Grand Prix ready for approval from the FIA. Hamilton later revised his opinion, and he thought the new format probably "would not be too exciting" and saw it being "a train". Formula One managing director Ross Brawn said that the sprint-qualifying experiment could be the first of many Formula One format experiments. The weekend was the first time since the 1959 German Grand Prix at AVUS (where results of the Grand Prix itself were decided on aggregate with drivers completing two 30-lap heats) that a Grand Prix meeting had consisted of more than one race for Grand Prix cars during a weekend.

==== Sprint qualifying ====
The sprint qualifying is a 100 kilometres (62 mi), seventeen laps for this event, race which would decide the starting order for the race on Sunday. The grid order for sprint qualifying would be decided via the normal Q1, Q2, Q3 qualifying session. The final classification of the sprint qualifying race would be the starting grid for the race. The winner of the sprint qualifying would be on pole. Additionally, sprint qualifying awards points to the top three finishers. The maximum time limit would be 60 minutes, and normal fuel flow limits would still apply. The top three in sprint qualifying would also be given a victory parade and special wreaths for their efforts.

== Practice ==
The first free practice session commenced on Friday at 14:30 BST in warm sunny conditions. Verstappen of Red Bull topped the timing sheets, 0.779 seconds ahead of Norris, who was second for McLaren. Reigning World Champion Hamilton was third for Mercedes, just 0.001 seconds slower than second-placed Norris.

The second free practice session took place on Saturday at 12:00 BST in sunny conditions. Verstappen topped the timing sheets again, 0.375 seconds ahead of Leclerc. Leclerc's teammate Sainz, was in third, 0.230 seconds behind. There were no major incidents in either of the practice sessions.

== Qualifying ==
Qualifying took place on Friday at 18:00 BST. Hamilton set the fastest time in qualifying, granting him first place for sprint qualifying ahead of Verstappen in second and his teammate Valtteri Bottas in third. As the winner of sprint qualifying would be given the title of polesitter, the driver who set the fastest time was instead named the event's speed king. Formula One's chief technical officer Pat Symonds said that control over how the title of pole position is declared lies with the Fédération Internationale de l'Automobile and not Formula One Management.

=== Qualifying classification ===
Pos.	No.	Driver	Constructor	Qualifying times			SQ grid
Pos.	No.	Driver	Constructor	Q1	Q2	Q3	SQ grid
1	44	(United Kingdom) Lewis Hamilton	Mercedes	1:26.786	1:26.023	1:26.134	1
2	33	(Netherlands) Max Verstappen	Red Bull Racing-Honda	1:26.751	1:26.315	1:26.209	2
3	77	(Finland) Valtteri Bottas	Mercedes	1:27.487	1:26.764	1:26.238	3
4	16	(Monaco) Charles Leclerc	Ferrari	1:27.051	1:26.919	1:26.828	4
5	11	(Mexico) Sergio Pérez	Red Bull Racing-Honda	1:27.121	1:27.073	1:26.844	5
6	4	(United Kingdom) Lando Norris	McLaren-Mercedes	1:27.444	1:27.220	1:26.897	6
7	3	(Australia) Daniel Ricciardo	McLaren-Mercedes	1:27.323	1:27.125	1:26.899	7
8	63	(United Kingdom) George Russell	Williams-Mercedes	1:27.671	1:27.080	1:26.971	8
9	55	(Spain) Carlos Sainz Jr.	Ferrari	1:27.337	1:26.848	1:27.007	9
10	5	(Germany) Sebastian Vettel	Aston Martin-Mercedes	1:27.493	1:27.103	1:27.179	10
11	14	(Spain) Fernando Alonso	Alpine-Renault	1:27.580	1:27.245	N/A	11
12	10	(France) Pierre Gasly	AlphaTauri-Honda	1:27.600	1:27.273	N/A	12
13	31	(France) Esteban Ocon	Alpine-Renault	1:27.415	1:27.340	N/A	13
14	99	(Italy) Antonio Giovinazzi	Alfa Romeo Racing-Ferrari	1:27.595	1:27.617	N/A	14
15	18	(Canada) Lance Stroll	Aston Martin-Mercedes	1:28.017	1:27.665	N/A	15
16	22	(Japan) Yuki Tsunoda	AlphaTauri-Honda	1:28.043	N/A	N/A	16
17	7	(Finland) Kimi Räikkönen	Alfa Romeo Racing-Ferrari	1:28.062	N/A	N/A	17
18	6	(Canada) Nicholas Latifi	Williams-Mercedes	1:28.254	N/A	N/A	18
19	47	(Germany) Mick Schumacher	Haas-Ferrari	1:28.738	N/A	N/A	19
20	9	(Russian Automobile Federation) Nikita Mazepin (Note: Nikita Mazepin is Russian, but he competed as a neutral competitor using the designation RAF (Russian Automobile Federation), as the Court of Arbitration for Sport upheld a ban on Russia competing at World Championships. The ban was implemented by the World Anti-Doping Agency in response to the state-sponsored doping program of Russian athletes.)	Haas-Ferrari	1:29.051	N/A	N/A	20
107% time: 1:32.823

== Sprint qualifying ==
Sprint qualifying took place on Saturday at 16:30 BST and was contested over seventeen laps. Hamilton lost out at the start with Verstappen overtaking him into first place. Verstappen had had trouble getting his car's tyres up to temperature in the cooler temperatures of qualifying, but it was much warmer for the sprint. Bottas and Leclerc remained in the third and fourth positions they started in for the duration of the sprint. Alonso went from eleventh to fifth in the first lap, while Nikita Mazepin hit his Haas teammate Mick Schumacher, causing Mazepin to spin on track. Also on the first lap, Russell and Sainz made contact, resulting in Sainz dropping down to 19th place; Russell was handed a three-place grid penalty by the FIA. The next major incident was when Pérez lost control of his car on lap 5, spinning off into the gravel. He was able to carry on but later retired on lap 16. Alonso, who finished the sprint in seventh, was given a warning for moving in the braking zone, to which he responded by saying that he intended to continue driving the same way for the rest of the year. Alonso was passed by the two McLaren drivers without much resistance, as they had faster cars than him, but he was then able to hold off Vettel's Aston Martin AMR21. Formula One held the event with the intent to analyse the views of audiences on the format, and noted that there had been both positive and negative reactions.

=== Sprint qualifying classification ===
Pos.	No.	Driver	Constructor	Laps	Time/Retired	Grid	Points	Final grid
1	33	(Netherlands) Max Verstappen	Red Bull Racing-Honda	17	25:38.426	2	3	1
2	44	(United Kingdom) Lewis Hamilton	Mercedes	17	+1.430	1	2	2
3	77	(Finland) Valtteri Bottas	Mercedes	17	+7.502	3	1	3
4	16	(Monaco) Charles Leclerc	Ferrari	17	+11.278	4		4
5	4	(United Kingdom) Lando Norris	McLaren-Mercedes	17	+24.111	6		5
6	3	(Australia) Daniel Ricciardo	McLaren-Mercedes	17	+30.959	7		6
7	14	(Spain) Fernando Alonso	Alpine-Renault	17	+43.527	11		7
8	5	(Germany) Sebastian Vettel	Aston Martin-Mercedes	17	+44.439	10		8
9	63	(United Kingdom) George Russell	Williams-Mercedes	17	+46.652	8		12^{a}
10	31	(France) Esteban Ocon	Alpine-Renault	17	+47.395	13		9
11	55	(Spain) Carlos Sainz Jr.	Ferrari	17	+47.798	9		10
12	10	(France) Pierre Gasly	AlphaTauri-Honda	17	+48.763	12		11
13	7	(Finland) Kimi Räikkönen	Alfa Romeo Racing-Ferrari	17	+50.677	17		13
14	18	(Canada) Lance Stroll	Aston Martin-Mercedes	17	+52.179	15		14
15	99	(Italy) Antonio Giovinazzi	Alfa Romeo Racing-Ferrari	17	+53.225	14		15
16	22	(Japan) Yuki Tsunoda	AlphaTauri-Honda	17	+53.567	16		16
17	6	(Canada) Nicholas Latifi	Williams-Mercedes	17	+55.162	18		17
18	47	(Germany) Mick Schumacher	Haas-Ferrari	17	+1:08.213	19		18
19	9	(Russian Automobile Federation) Nikita Mazepin	Haas-Ferrari	17	+1:17.648	20		19
20^{b}	11	(Mexico) Sergio Pérez	Red Bull Racing-Honda	16	Vibration	5		PL^{b}
Fastest lap: (United Kingdom) Lewis Hamilton (Mercedes) – 1:29.937 (lap 17)

==== Notes ====
- ^a – George Russell received a three-place grid penalty for causing a collision with Carlos Sainz Jr.
- ^b – Sergio Pérez was classified as he completed more than 90% of the sprint qualifying distance. He was due to start the race from the back of the grid for exceeding his quota of power unit elements. This made no difference as he was already due to start from last place. He was then required to start the race from the pit lane for a rear wing and suspension setup change in parc fermé.

== Race ==
The race started at 15:00 BST (14:00 UTC). Hamilton had a better start than Verstappen, and they ran side by side through the first corner, each contesting for the lead throughout the first half of the lap. A better run out of the fourth turn allowed Hamilton to briefly get ahead going in to the sixth turn, but Verstappen was able to get back past on the inside, with Hamilton then accelerating faster than Verstappen out of the seventh turn. Hamilton collided with Verstappen into Copse corner, with Verstappen's rear-right tyre stripped from the wheel rim. Verstappen slid sideways across the gravel trap on the outside of the track, and collided with the tyre wall at at least 290 km/h (180 mph).

The crash saw a red flag brought out following Verstappen's retirement, with the race suspended for approximately thirty minutes while Verstappen's car was removed and the tyre wall repaired. Hamilton received a ten-second time penalty for causing the collision, with stewards ruling that Hamilton was predominantly, but not fully, at fault in the contact. Hamilton's car was repaired during the stoppage. Verstappen was taken to the circuit medical centre, and subsequently hospital, for precautionary checks after the 51 g (500 m/s^{2}; 1,600 ft/s^{2}) sideways impact into the barriers. Verstappen was released from hospital later that night as he was not seriously injured.

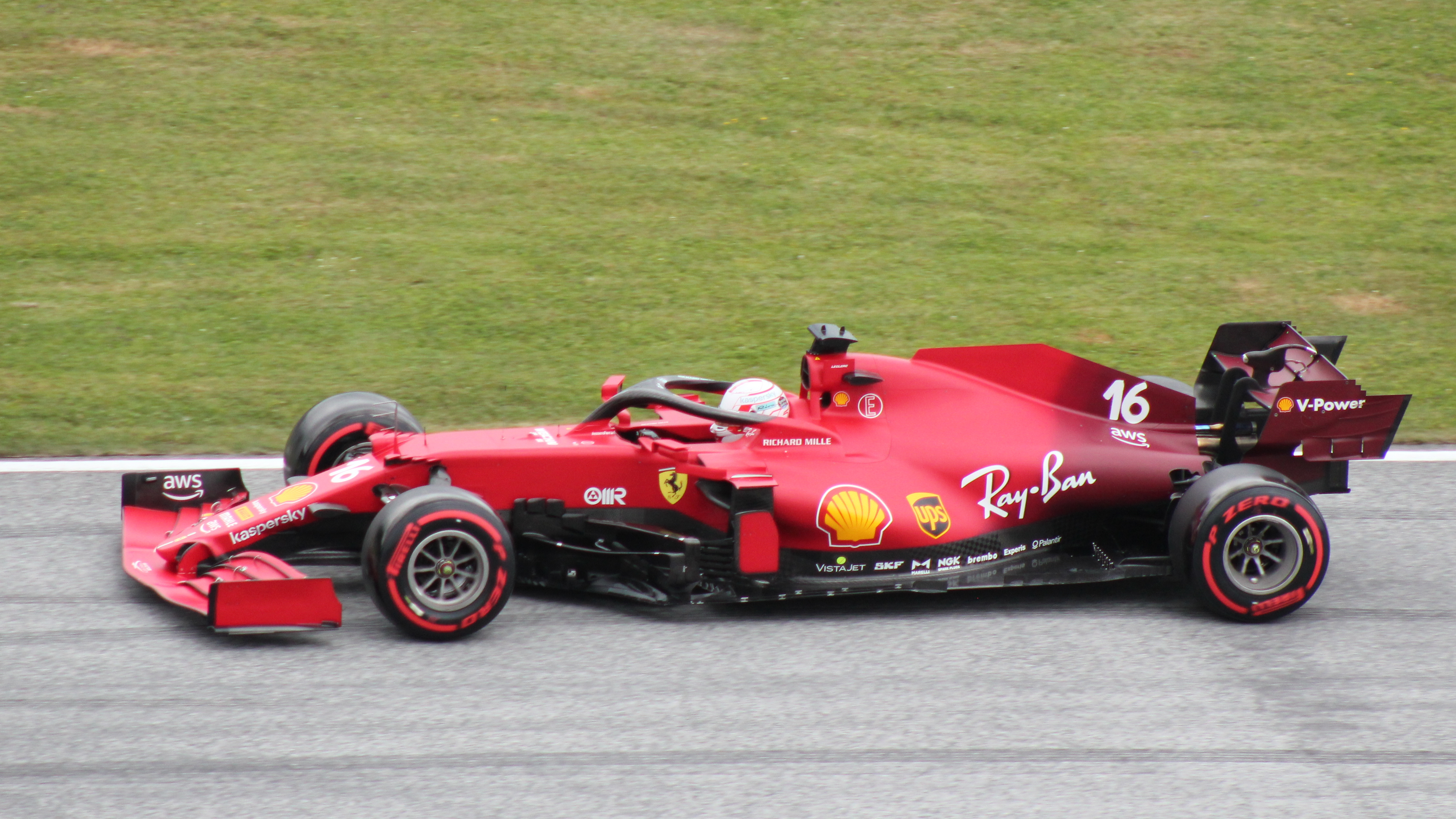
Charles Leclerc (pictured at the previous round) led most of the race on his way to second.

The collision with Verstappen caused Hamilton to lose speed, allowing Leclerc to get through into the lead before the race was neutralised. Hamilton pitted from second, served his ten-second time penalty and came back out fourth. He quickly dispatched Norris's McLaren and then his teammate, Bottas, who was instructed to let Hamilton past. Norris suffered a slow pit stop following an issue with the rear right tyre, placing him behind Bottas in fourth as he rejoined the race, where he remained for the rest of the race. Norris lost further time after emerging from the pit lane as he had to clear Alonso. This was the fifteenth consecutive race in which Norris finished in the points. Bottas's water bottle broke during the race. Leclerc struggled with intermittent power issues throughout the first half of the race, with momentary losses of power keeping the interval between him and Hamilton at around 1.5 seconds. Hamilton caught up to Leclerc on lap 50, where he overtook him for the lead. Hamilton's move on Leclerc was similar to the one he made on Verstappen, but with less fuel in the tank and warmer tyres Hamilton did not understeer this time around and held the apex. Leclerc had a little moment mid corner that caused him to run wide on the exit, allowing Hamilton to complete the overtake. Leclerc had led for almost the entire race, which was seen as unexpected given the relative pace of the Ferrari SF21 to the Mercedes W12 and the Red Bull RB16B.

Vettel lost control of his Aston Martin during a battle with Alonso on the fourth lap. This saw Vettel drop down to last; he recovered into 17th, but later retired. Kimi Räikkönen, in the Alfa Romeo, also spun, on lap 49, after a minor collision with Red Bull driver Pérez. Pérez pitted on the next lap for new soft tyres, in a bid to take Hamilton's fastest lap away (which was worth a championship point). Scuderia AlphaTauri driver Pierre Gasly had a puncture late in the race, which dropped him out of the points.

=== Post-race and retrospective ===
Much of the post-race debate surrounded the Hamilton–Verstappen incident on the first lap, with the collision compared by some to previous collisions which have occurred during close championship battles, and the likelihood of incidents under such circumstances also being noted. Verstappen said that the penalty issued to Hamilton mid-race was not enough, and felt Hamilton's post-race celebrations were "disrespectful and unsportsmanlike". Mercedes said that they would not have celebrated the win had they not known Verstappen was uninjured. Hamilton said that he did not believe himself to be at fault, adding that "regardless of whether I agree with the penalty, I'll take it on the chin and I just kept working." Hamilton expressed relief that Verstappen was uninjured.

Red Bull team principal Christian Horner called Hamilton's move "desperate" and his victory "hollow". He also said "we are lucky that there wasn't someone seriously hurt. That's what I'm most angry about", and that he could not "see how Lewis can take any satisfaction from the win when you have put your fellow competitor and driver in hospital." Horner said Verstappen was winded in the crash. Red Bull advisor Helmut Marko accused Hamilton of dangerous driving and suggested that the seven-time champion be banned for one race. Mercedes team principal Toto Wolff defended Hamilton, stating that it was merely a racing incident and "it always takes two to tango", and brushed off Marko's criticism of Hamilton. Wolff believed that Hamilton's move complied with the sport's guidelines on when an overtaking driver is entitled to a corner, as Hamilton was further alongside Verstappen than the diagrams provided to competitors illustrated, although said guidelines stipulate that this only applies if the driver "make[s] the corner cleanly." Mercedes trackside engineer Andrew Shovlin stated that the collision was "inevitable", citing Verstappen's aggressive driving style. Red Bull were also concerned about the financial cost of repairing or replacing a crashed racing car. According to Horner, the damage amounted to at least £1,300,000.

Several drivers, including Leclerc and Bottas, believed that it was a racing incident, with Sainz adding that it was "difficult to judge". Leclerc (who was the next car behind Verstappen and Hamilton) noted: "There was space on the inside. Maybe Lewis was not completely at the apex but it is also true Max was quite aggressive on the outside. Things happen." Daniel Ricciardo said that Hamilton "went in too hot" but felt that the collision was unintentional, and that the aerodynamic design of the cars was a major contributing factor. Alonso believed neither Hamilton nor Verstappen had done anything wrong, suggesting Hamilton was at a tricky position.

Formula One sporting director Brawn said that he hoped the incident would not be repeated, adding that "nobody wants the championship decided on crashes and penalties." IndyCar Series championship leader Álex Palou, who would win the title later that year, said that he would have done the same thing as Hamilton or Verstappen in either of their positions. Race director Michael Masi stood ground with the stewards' decision, stating that the stewards do not take the consequences of an incident into account when deciding penalties.

Hamilton became the target of racial abuse online following the race. Fellow competitors Red Bull and McLaren (with whom Hamilton won his first Drivers' Championship title in 2008), along with Formula One and other members of the Formula One community, also condemned those who were racist against Hamilton. Social media firm Facebook, Inc criticised the abuse and said they had deleted some offensive comments from their platforms.

Several drivers expressed disappointment in their post-race results, with Norris and Sainz in particular stating that their long pit stops endured during the race cost them a better result, the former a potential podium finish. Regarding his own race, Leclerc said that he "gave not 100%, but 200%." Pérez lamented that he would have finished in seventh had he not taken a third stop to take away the fastest lap extra point from Hamilton as well as his late clash with Räikkönen, with Gasly echoing similar thoughts after a third stop for a late puncture denied him a potential points finish. Räikkönen felt that he had spent most of his race trying to prevent faster cars from getting past him. In the build up to the Hungarian Grand Prix on 27 July Red Bull requested the right to review the severity of Hamilton's penalty for the incident with Verstappen but the Stewards dismissed it. Red Bull's motivation for lodging the appeal was questioned in some quarters, with the potential negative public relations outcomes being noted. In a post-season interview Verstappen (who now was a World Champion) said being in hospital after the crash was among the lowest points of his title winning 2021 season. Verstappen told the GP Racing magazine the following year that he no longer had any ill feeling with Hamilton over the accident.

=== Race classification ===
Pos.	No.	Driver	Constructor	Laps	Time/Retired	Grid	Points
1	44	(United Kingdom) Lewis Hamilton	Mercedes	52	1:58:23.284	2	25
2	16	(Monaco) Charles Leclerc	Ferrari	52	+3.871	4	18
3	77	(Finland) Valtteri Bottas	Mercedes	52	+11.125	3	15
4	4	(United Kingdom) Lando Norris	McLaren-Mercedes	52	+28.573	5	12
5	3	(Australia) Daniel Ricciardo	McLaren-Mercedes	52	+42.624	6	10
6	55	(Spain) Carlos Sainz Jr.	Ferrari	52	+43.454	10	8
7	14	(Spain) Fernando Alonso	Alpine-Renault	52	+1:12.093	7	6
8	18	(Canada) Lance Stroll	Aston Martin-Mercedes	52	+1:14.289	14	4
9	31	(France) Esteban Ocon	Alpine-Renault	52	+1:16.162	9	2
10	22	(Japan) Yuki Tsunoda	AlphaTauri-Honda	52	+1:22.065	16	1
11	10	(France) Pierre Gasly	AlphaTauri-Honda	52	+1:25.327	11	
12	63	(United Kingdom) George Russell	Williams-Mercedes	51	+1 lap	12	
13	99	(Italy) Antonio Giovinazzi	Alfa Romeo Racing-Ferrari	51	+1 lap	15	
14	6	(Canada) Nicholas Latifi	Williams-Mercedes	51	+1 lap	17	
15	7	(Finland) Kimi Räikkönen	Alfa Romeo Racing-Ferrari	51	+1 lap	13	
16	11	(Mexico) Sergio Pérez	Red Bull Racing-Honda	51	+1 lap	PL	
17	9	(Russian Automobile Federation) Nikita Mazepin	Haas-Ferrari	51	+1 lap	19	
18	47	(Germany) Mick Schumacher	Haas-Ferrari	51	+1 lap	18	
Ret	5	(Germany) Sebastian Vettel	Aston Martin-Mercedes	40	Overheating	8	
Ret	33	(Netherlands) Max Verstappen	Red Bull Racing-Honda	0	Collision	1	
Fastest lap: (Mexico) Sergio Pérez (Red Bull Racing-Honda) – 1:28.617 (lap 50)

== Championship standings after the race ==
Drivers' Championship standings

	Pos.	Driver	Points
Unchanged	1	(Netherlands) Max Verstappen	185
Unchanged	2	(United Kingdom) Lewis Hamilton	177
1	3	(United Kingdom) Lando Norris	113
1	4	(Finland) Valtteri Bottas	108
2	5	(Mexico) Sergio Pérez	104

Constructors' Championship standings

	Pos.	Constructor	Points
Unchanged	1	(Austria) Red Bull Racing-Honda	289
Unchanged	2	(Germany) Mercedes	285
Unchanged	3	(United Kingdom) McLaren-Mercedes	163
Unchanged	4	(Italy) Ferrari	148
Unchanged	5	(Italy) AlphaTauri-Honda	49

- Note: Only the top five positions are included for both sets of standings.

== See also ==
- 2021 Silverstone FIA Formula 2 round
- 2021 W Series Silverstone round

== Notes ==
Previous race: 2021 Austrian Grand Prix	FIA Formula One World Championship; 2021 season	Next race: 2021 Hungarian Grand Prix
Previous race: 2020 British Grand Prix; Previous race at Silverstone Circuit: 70th Anniversary Grand Prix	British Grand Prix	Next race: 2022 British Grand Prix
