= MEMS gravimeters =

Systems for measuring changes to gravity

MEMS gravimeters are spring based, relative gravimetry measurement instruments fabricated with silicon microelectromechanical systems (MEMS) technology. Like conventional spring gravimeters, they measure tiny changes in local gravitational acceleration by sensing the displacement of a spring-supported proof mass or the resulting inertial force that it experiences. The key difference between a standard MEMS accelerometer and a MEMS gravimeter is the gravimeter’s greatly reduced long-term drift and higher sensitivity at very low frequencies (comparable to those of seismometers). Low drift is essential for detecting the subtle Earth tides (tidal fluctuations of gravity) – a standard benchmark for gravimeter stability. The potential advantages of MEMS gravimeters include drastically reduced size, weight, power, and cost, along with greater robustness, compared to traditional gravimeter technologies such as quartz zero-length spring gravimeters, cold-atom gravimeters, or superconducting gravimeters. Because MEMS devices can be mass-produced with silicon wafer fabrication (similarly to smartphone sensors), they promise much lower cost and volume, enabling wider deployment in new applications and markets. MEMS gravimeters have been envisioned for applications like geophysical surveying, natural hazard monitoring, and underground prospecting where arrays of small, inexpensive sensors could be deployed in the field.

== Designs ==
=== Geometrical Anti-spring Gravimeter ===
The first successful MEMS gravimeter was demonstrated in 2015 by a team at the University of Glasgow led by Giles Hammond and Douglas Paul. They employed a geometrical anti-spring suspension - a form of non-linear spring that becomes increasingly compliant (softer) as the proof mass deflects from its rest position. Unlike a Hooke’s-law spring (where restoring force increases linearly with displacement), the anti-spring mechanism allowed the device’s resonant frequency to be much lower than a linear spring of similar size. The Glasgow MEMS gravimeter had a resonant frequency of only 2.3 Hz, compared to hundreds of hertz for an equivalent linear spring, yielding a higher acceleration sensitivity around 40 μGal/√Hz (where 1 μGal = 10^{−8} m/s²). This was the first MEMS device stable and sensitive enough to clearly measure Earth’s tidal gravity variation. Subsequent improvements to the Glasgow design have further reduced the instrument noise floor, with the sensor self-noise achieving a bias instability value of 0.91 μGal after averaging over 250s. This enhanced sensitivity enabled the recording of Earth tides over a 19-day span with a tidal signal correlation of 0.975 to the theoretical model - a performance on par with much larger and costlier instruments.

=== Vibrating Beam Gravimeter ===
Another approach to MEMS gravimetry developed at Cambridge University uses resonant force sensing rather than a displacement readout. In 2014 the team led by Professor Ashwin Seshia published results on a seismic-grade resonant MEMS accelerometer. Expanding on this in 2017-18, the team demonstrated a MEMS gravimeter based on a vibrating beam accelerometer (VBA) design that tracked earth tide fluctuations at a level comparable to commercially available traditional gravimeters, meeting the stability requirements to serve as a relative gravimeter as well as long-period seismometer. In this device, the proof mass is coupled to one or more taut silicon beams whose resonant frequency shifts in response to the slightest change in gravity. By monitoring the frequency of these vibrating beams, gravity changes can be measured as frequency shifts. A differential frequency readout and active temperature control are used to compensate for thermal drift, achieving excellent stability over long periods. Testing in the 2017-18 study on the VBA MEMS gravimeter demonstrated an output Allan deviation of approximately 9 μGal over 1000s integration and a noise floor on the order of 100 μGal/√Hz in ambient conditions. One intrinsic advantage of the resonant approach is that the scale factor (frequency shift per unit acceleration) is invariant to device size to first order, meaning miniaturization does not inherently compromise sensitivity. A second advantage of the resonant approach is that the proof mass resonance frequency can be set over two orders of magnitude higher than for the displacement sensing approach in order to meet an equivalent measurement sensitivity level enabling improved robustness to shock and vibration. A third advantage is the inherently large dynamic range without the requirement of a force-feedback scheme.

The research at Cambridge University has been spun out to a commercial venture, Silicon Microgravity, which developed the first commercially available MEMS gravimeter. The commercially available GAIA-FIELD devices now achieve a noise floor of <25 μGal/√Hz with an Allan deviation of <5 μGal at 120s. By miniaturizing the gravimeter the company has created instruments deployable on portable platforms for a range of survey applications. Their MEMS gravimeter technology is reported to be over a thousand times more precise than standard MEMS accelerometers found in consumer devices, finally reaching the performance needed for gravity mapping and surveying applications.

=== Quasi-zero-stiffness design ===
Researchers have also explored other MEMS gravimeter designs that achieve low effective spring stiffness. In 2019, a team at Huazhong University of Science and Technology (HUST) in China introduced a MEMS gravimeter with a novel curved beam suspension that provides quasi-zero effective stiffness when combined with folded springs. This mechanism creates a very low resonant frequency (around 3 Hz) while supporting a relatively large proof mass. The HUST gravimeter used an optical displacement sensor for readout, and achieved a high sensitivity of about 8 μGal/√Hz along with a large dynamic range of roughly 8000 mGal (±0.008 g). In co-located tests, it successfully measured Earth tides over 5–6 days, with its data correlating at 0.91 against a superconducting gravimeter serving as a reference. This demonstrated that even a purely displacement-based MEMS gravimeter can approach the performance of much larger instruments when enhanced by suspension design (in this case, a negative-stiffness bistable beam to counteract the positive stiffness of the springs). Such quasi-zero-stiffness and resonant approaches continue to be active research directions, alongside improvements in packaging, readout electronics, and thermal stabilization to further refine MEMS gravimeter precision.

The first field trials of MEMS gravimeters were reported in 2017. The EC project NEWTON-g has four of the Glasgow MEMS gravimeters on Mount Etna in Italy trying to image magma movements inside the volcano to see if they can be used to predict when the volcano might erupt. In 2024, a Glasgow MEMS gravimeter was successfully deployed near the summit of Poás Volcano in Costa Rica as part of the AVERT (Anticipating Volcano Eruptions in Real-Time) project led by Columbia University. This marked the second such deployment of a MEMS gravimeter on an active volcano. Silicon Microgravity Ltd demonstrated the first mapping of a buried gravity anomaly in 2021 and moved to commercial field trials with the support of a UK Defence Innovation project. The project focused on the use of resonant MEMS gravimeter technology for detecting underground structures such as tunnels and bunkers. The company’s compact GAIA-FIELD gravimeter has demonstrated the detection of a ~14 μGal anomaly caused by a 2m diameter air filled void 12 m deep, demonstrating this novel alternative to conventional gravity instruments for geophysical surveys.
