= CoRoT-2b =

Extrasolar planet in the constellation Aquila

- Artist's illustration of the exoplanet CoRoT-2b and its host star

Discovery
- Discovered by: CoRoT mission
- Discovery site: Earth's orbit
- Discovery date: 2007-12-??, announced 2007-12-20
- Detection method: Transit method

Orbital characteristics
- Semi-major axis: 0.0281 ± 0.0005 AU (4,204,000 ± 75,000 km)
- Eccentricity: 0 (assumed)
- Orbital period (sidereal): 1.74299705(15) d
- Inclination: 87.84 ± 0.10
- Star: CoRoT-2

Physical characteristics
- Mean radius: 1.429 ± 0.047 R_{J}
- Mass: 3.31 ± 0.16 M_{J}
- Mean density: 1.310 ± 0.040 g/cm^{3}
- Surface gravity: 38.2 m/s^{2} (125 ft/s^{2})
- Albedo: <0.12
- Temperature: 1,537 ± 35 K

CoRoT-2b (formerly known as CoRoT-Exo-2b) is the second extrasolar planet to be detected by the French-led CoRoT mission, and orbits the star CoRoT-2 at a distance of 700 light-years from Earth towards the constellation Aquila. Its discovery was announced on 20 December 2007. After its discovery via the transit method, its mass was confirmed via the radial velocity method.

== Characteristics ==
The radial velocity trend of CoRoT-2, caused by the presence of CoRoT-2 b

The planet is a large hot Jupiter, about 1.43 times the radius of Jupiter and approximately 3.3 times as massive. Its huge size is due to the intense heating from its parent star, which causes the outer layers of its atmosphere to bloat. The extremely large radius of the planet indicates that CoRoT-2b is very hot, estimated to be around 1,500 K, even hotter than would be expected given its location close to its parent star. This fact may be a sign of tidal heating due to interactions with another planet. At Jupiter-like distances its radius would roughly be the same as Jupiter. The complete phase curve of this planet has been observed.

CoRoT-2b orbits its star approximately once every 1.7 days, and orbits the star in a prograde direction close to the star's equator. Its parent star is a G-type star, a bit cooler than the Sun but more active. It is located about 800 light-years from Earth.

As of 2008, the CoRoT-2b spin-orbit angle (that is, the angle between the equator of the star and the plane of the planet orbit) was calculated by Bouchy et al. by means of the Rossiter–McLaughlin effect with a value of +7.2 ± 4.5 °. The spin-orbit angle was revised in 2012 to 4.0^{+5.9}_{−6.1}°.
