= Lunar Surface Gravimeter =

1972 Apollo lunar science experiment

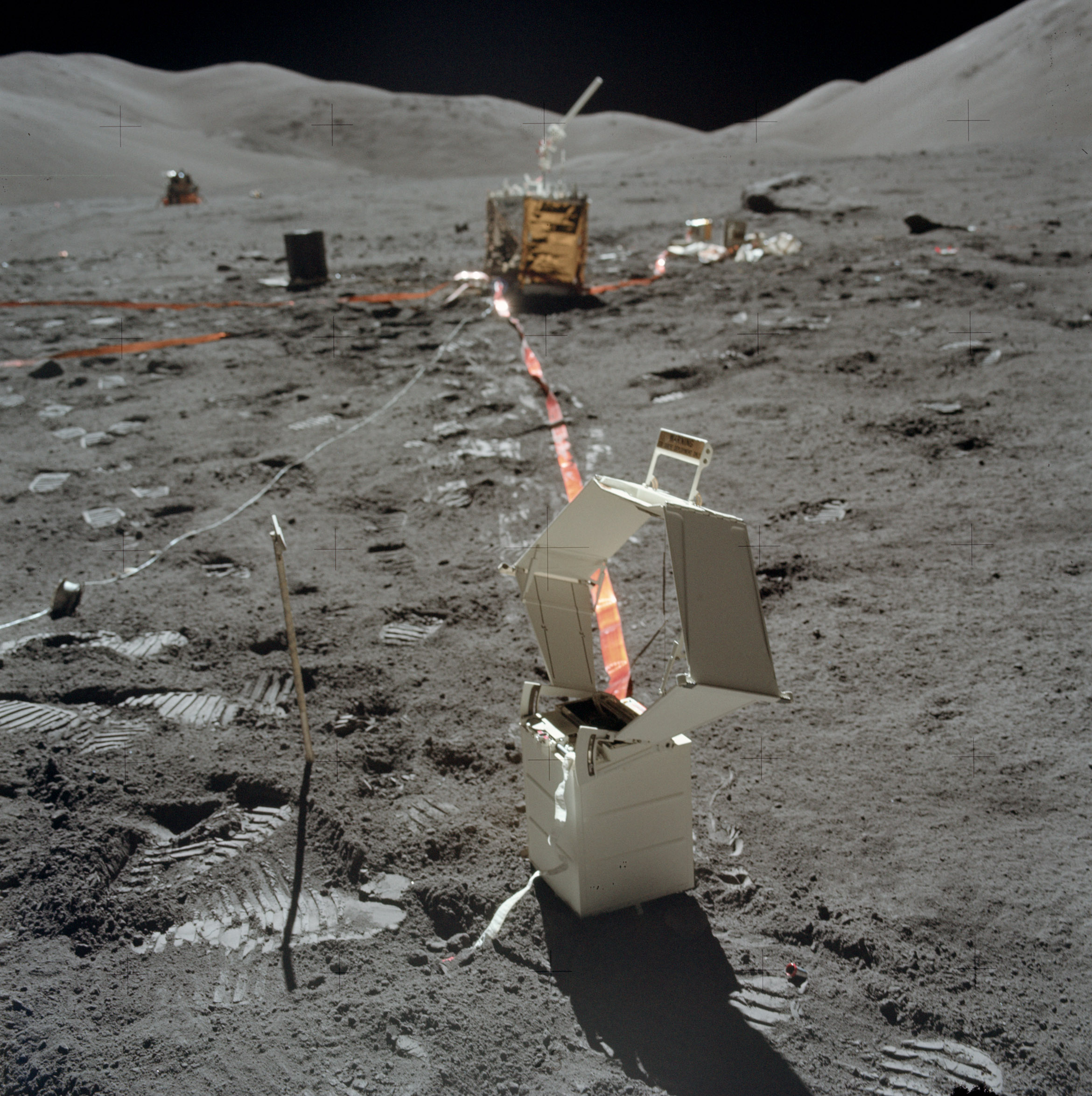
- The Apollo 17 Lunar Surface Gravimeter on the Moon with ALSEP central station in background
- Acronym: LSG
- Uses: Gravitational wave detection, Seismology
- Notable experiments: Apollo 17
- Inventor: Lucien LaCoste and Arnold Romberg
- Manufacturer: Bendix Corporation, LaCoste Romberg, Arthur D. Little

The Lunar Surface Gravimeter (LSG) was a lunar science experiment that was deployed on the surface of the Moon by the astronauts of Apollo 17 on December 12, 1972. The LSG was conceived by its principal investigator Joseph Weber. Weber proposed a number of experimental methods for the detection of gravitational waves, and would go on to be described as the "founding father" of gravitational wave detection. The experiment aimed to measure changes in the local gravitational strength on the Moon's surface through the use of a gravimeter. These measurements were intended to provide insight into the internal structures of the Moon as it tidally deformed due interaction with the gravitational fields of the Earth and Sun. In addition the experiment hoped to contribute experimental evidence of the existence of gravitational waves.

The instrument as a whole was built by Bendix Corporation, who were also responsible for providing operational support for all packages of the Apollo Lunar Surface Experiments Package (ALSEP) flying as part of the Apollo Program. The instrument's primary sensor was built by LaCoste Romberg, a notable producer of gravimeters. The sensor was based on a modified LaCoste and Romberg D-meter and consisted of an adjustable mass on a sprung lever attached to the instrument's measurement electronics. It was capable of measuring gravity to 1 part in 10^{5}.

The gravimeter unit that was deployed on Apollo 17 was not properly calibrated and could not be properly zeroed as the instruments balance weights were too light for use in the Moon's gravity. Whilst the experiment continued to be used as a one-axis seismometer, the data received back was noisy and required more modern analysis techniques before the experiments data was proven valuable. The instrument continued to operate until September 30, 1977, when operations support for ALSEP was terminated due to budgetary constraints. Later understanding of gravitational waves showed that even if the experiment had worked as intended, it would not have been sensitive enough to detect them. Two conceptually similar experiments, the Lunar Gravitational-wave Antenna and Lunar Seismic and Gravitational Antenna, were proposed in 2020 as the Artemis program looks to return to human exploration of the Moon.

== Background ==
Gravitational waves are waves of the intensity of gravity that are generated by the accelerated masses of binary stars and other motions of gravitating masses, and propagate as waves outward from their source at the speed of light. They were first proposed by Oliver Heaviside in 1893 and then later by Henri Poincaré in 1905 as the gravitational equivalent of electromagnetic waves. In 1916 Albert Einstein demonstrated that gravitational waves result from his general theory of relativity as ripples in spacetime. By the time of the development of the Apollo program, it was believed only the largest objects in the universe such as stars and galaxies would generate gravitational waves of sufficient magnitude to be detectable.

Following his attendance a general relativity conference at Chapel Hill in 1957, Joseph Weber started work on designing and building detectors that could experimentally prove the existence of gravitational waves. In 1960, he published his proposal for a mechanical detector that would consist of a suspended metal cylinder that would interact with gravitational waves and produce induced vibrations that could be detected. Weber and other members of the scientific community were also exploring other experimental mechanisms to prove the existence of gravitational waves. In 1961, Weber theorised that gravitational waves could induce a resonant dilation in planetary bodies. He suggested that the Earth and Moon could both be leveraged to examine their interactions with gravitational waves. The Brans–Dicke theory, established by Robert H. Dicke and Carl H. Brans, supported this. The theory suggested that changes in space-time caused by gravitational waves would result in a disturbance of the isostatic equilibrium of a planetary body as the waves propagated through it. Weber presented at a National Aeronautics and Space Administration (NASA) organised conference on relativity in 1961, highlighting that using the Moon to detect gravitational waves was an attractive option due to being seismically quieter than the Earth. These events occurred in parallel to the early feasibility studies of the Apollo program and NASA had already identified a desire to send a gravimeter to the Moon as early as February 1960.

Teams from University of California, Los Angeles, Princeton University and University of Maryland (led by Weber) would for several years attempt to measure the Earth's responses to gravitational waves. This would be achieved by using a gravimeter to measure how the Earth would expand and contract, inwards and outwards from its center, effectively turning the entirety of the Earth into a gravitational wave antenna. The devices used for these explorations included various prototype LaCoste and Romberg type gravimeters, that allowed extremely precise measurements. These sensors proved difficult to use for detecting gravity waves due to thermal noise. While teams did try to eliminate sources of noise in their devices, it was eventually found that due to the Earth being a seismically and geomorphically active body, the Earth's background noise for these types of devices could not be overcome at the time. Despite the setback, by 1964 plans for the development of an Apollo surface gravimetry experiment were underway leveraging the same technologies. In addition to seeking evidence for gravitational waves, the gravimeter would aim to provide precise information on the tidal deformation of the Moon due to its interaction with the gravitational fields of the Earth and Sun. Whilst LaCoste and Romberg gravimeters were not designed for operation in the harsher lunar environment, there was confidence in being able to adapt the device with the biggest expected challenge to overcome being the thermal sensitivity of the device.

Weber had continued developing his bar detectors through the early 1960s iterating on their design and implementation to also reduce the amount of seismic and thermal noise the detector was exposed to, and by 1967 he believed his detectors were picking up signals indicative of gravitational waves. In 1969 Weber published a paper formally declaring his detection of gravitational waves, followed in 1970 with the claim that regular gravitational waves were being detected from the Galactic Center. Whilst there was almost immediate doubt about the scientific validity of these observations, it was intended that the Lunar Surface Gravimeter instrument would work in conjunction with the Weber bar instruments on Earth to better categorise the claimed observations recorded by the instruments.

== Experiment history ==
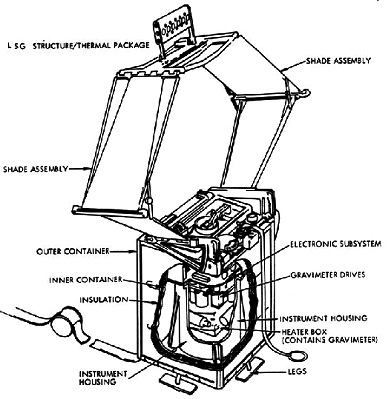
Schematic diagram of the Lunar Surface Gravimeter

In 1964, the Director of the Office of Manned Space Science, Willis Foster, proposed four geophysics teams for the Apollo lunar surface exploration program. One of the teams was dedicated to gravimetry and consisted of Joseph Weber and Gordon J. F. MacDonald, who was at that time at the University of California, Los Angeles. The team evaluated a number of proposed gravimetry experiments but despite Weber's own work on LSG prototypes starting in 1964, NASA's approval of the Lunar Surface Gravimeter only came late on in the planning process for Apollo 17.

Bendix Corporation was the prime contractor for the Apollo Lunar Surface Experiments Package and were responsible for managing the design, manufacture and testing of all experiments and their integration with the Apollo Lunar Surface Experiments Package (ALSEP) central station. Other experiments that flew as part of ALSEP included the Heat Flow Experiment, Lunar Ejecta and Meteorites Experiment, Lunar Atmospheric Composition Experiment, and Lunar Seismic Profiling Experiment.

Each ALSEP experiment had their own prime contractor allocated, and for the LSG the experiment's flight versions were also manufactured by Bendix. In addition to having primary responsibility for the overall manufacturer of the instrument, Bendix were also responsible for the flight hardware's electronics, due to LaCoste Romberg, a notable producer of gravimeters, not having previous experience building gravimeters for use in the environment of space. The LSG's sensor was developed and built by LaCoste Romberg, and the instrument's thermal control was provided by the Arthur D. Little company.

Concerns were raised by Marshall Space Flight Center about whether the experiment could be delivered by July 1972 in time. To alleviate some of the time pressures, rather than being integrated at Bendix with the rest of the ALSEP experiments in preparation for flight on board Apollo, integration of the experiment was done at Kennedy Space Center.

=== Instrument description ===
The instrument was a gravimeter, based on the LaCoste and Romberg D-meter, that primarily consists of an adjustable mass on a sprung lever attached to the instrument's measurement electronics. The experiment had a total mass of 12.7 kg, a volume of 26,970 cm^{3}, and utilised a maximum of 9.3 W of power. It was capable of measuring gravity to 1 part in 10^{5}. The mass was adjustable through the addition or removal of weights which would allow the experiment to both be tested in Earth gravity to prove out its functionality, and also be operated in lunar gravity without modification to the device. The measurement electronics were primarily driven by a trio of capacitor plates. Two plates were affixed to the experiment's frame in parallel with a third plate between them attached to the sprung lever. The gravimeter was designed to measure seismic responses in a range between 0 and 16 Hz. The experiment required its operational temperature to be maintained at 323 K (50 °C; 122 °F) to within 1 millidegree. To regulate the instrument temperature a static sunshield was attached to reduce excess heat buildup, a hole on the top of the instrument allowed the radiation of heat into space, insulation on the bottom of the instrument prevented the transfer of heat from the lunar surface and an internal electric heater prevented the device from cooling. Power and communications with the experiment were provided via a ribbon cable connected to the ALSEP central station, through which all other active ALSEP experiments were provided with power.

=== Surface operations ===
The experiment was deployed on the Moon's surface by Apollo 17 astronauts Gene Cernan and Harrison Schmitt on December 12, 1972. Deployment consisted of levelling the instrument, deploying the sunshield and attaching the power and communications cable to the ALSEP central station.

Following the deployment of the LSG, it was discovered that the instrument's calibration weights were not heavy enough to allow the sprung level to be properly balanced. Apollo 17 astronauts made several attempts to debug the issue on the Moon. This included releveling the instrument, rocking the instrument side to side, tapping "sharply" with increasing force and sending a variety of commands to the device. Eventually it was accepted the LSG was no longer able to operate as a gravimeter. Adjustments were made to the sensor via remote commands by placing the weight mechanism in contact with the sprung level, applying a small amount of force. The hope was that it could be used as a low-fidelity seismograph which is how it functioned for the remainder of its operational life.

The instrument experienced large deviations from its desired operational temperatures in both March 1974 and July 1975, when the instrument's internal heater became stuck in a mode which kept the heater active. In both instances, the heater was manually commanded to cycle in order to reset it and allow the instrument to return to its operational temperature and continued to return data. The instrument continued to operate until September 30, 1977, when operations support for ALSEP was terminated due to budgetary constraints.

=== Failure cause ===
It is agreed that the instruments balance weights were too light for use in the Moon's gravity and unable to provide the necessary adjustments to the instrument's sensor that would allow the sprung lever to balance freely and move unhindered.

The experiment's researchers from University of Maryland claimed that this was due to an arithmetic error, and claimed this was an error known by the manufacturers LaCoste Romberg. LaCoste Romberg addressed the device's failure nearly 30 years later. The challenge the company described is that the weights of the masses for use on the Moon could not simply be assumed to be 1/6th the mass of those for testing on Earth. Due to the need to factor in the mechanical properties of the sprung lever and its center of gravity, no two devices were perfectly alike. Each instrument would normally be assessed by comparing read-outs against known gravity values at test locations, and the device's weights adjusted to account for the variations inherent to each instrument. This was done for the test article, but was not done for the flight article to speed up the manufacturing process to meet the tight deadlines. Mass values that had been calculated for the flight-like test article were used for the weights on the actual flight hardware, and subsequently only found to be incorrect after deployment during the mission.

This problem was compounded by that the fact that when modifying the D-meter design for use on the Moon, a decision was taken to reduce the extent with which fine adjustments could be made since the instrument was going to be static. The result was an instrument that had half of the fine-adjustment capability. If this change had not been made, then the wrong mass values could have been accounted for and the device operated normally. Apollo 17's Schmitt claimed that Weber's team had refused to test the device on a slope in a way that would emulate lunar gravity, in order to protect the proprietary nature of the instrument.

== Science ==
=== Gravimetry ===
Due to the instrument's failure, the LSG did not manage to achieve two of its primary objectives, to identify any gravitational wave–induced oscillations in the Moon and to measure the isostatic response to tidal forces from the Sun and Earth. Since the deployment of the instrument, it has become known that Weber bars were not capable of detecting gravitational waves nor was the LSG sensitive enough to detect gravitational waves.

=== Seismography ===
To get the instrument to operate as a seismograph, there was a need to use the weight caging mechanism to apply a force to the sprung lever in order to balance it. This had significant negative effects on the instrument. It set up substantial new harmonic resonances in the instrument, reduced its sensitivity to some frequencies and increased its sensitivity to frequencies now occupied by the device's own resonance.

The data received from ALSEP experiments would typically be sent as tapes to the principal investigator of each experiment for analysis. It was then expected the principal investigator would forward on the tapes to be archived by the National Space Science Data Center. Weber's team did not transfer any of the measurements taken between 1972 and 1976 to the National Space Science Data Center, release any of the data themselves and no examination of the instrument's operation as a seismometer occurred. One PhD was completed by Russell Tobias based on this experiment. In the instrument's final report, it was stated that the computers used for analysing the experiment's data were taken back by NASA, although this applied to many lunar science experiments.

Even though the data between 1972 and 1976 remains unavailable, from March 1976 there were operational changes in how data was received and processed from the ALSEP station, with all data being sent to the University of Texas. Data was stored in a raw form and required decoding for each instrument. In 2015, an evaluation of this data found that the instrument detected deep and shallow moonquakes, and impact events. The investigation suggested that combining the LSG and other Apollo seismograph data might increase the resolution and understanding of the Moon's internal structure.

=== Future experiments ===
Whilst the LSG failed in its original objectives, the potential for the Moon as an environment conducive to the study of gravitational waves remains. The Moon in a general sense exhibits very little seismic activity but particularly in the frequency bands suited to the study of gravitational waves, the Moon exhibits a noise level orders of magnitude lower than found on Earth. Areas on the Moon's surface that are in permanent shadow, such as at the lunar poles, are thermally stable. This reduces any instrument noise caused by thermal variability. As well as being thermally stable, these locations have been measured to have the coldest known temperatures in the Solar System. Cool temperatures reduce sensor noise caused by the thermal motion of particles. With NASA and the European Space Agency (ESA) working towards a new period of human exploration on the Moon, both agencies have sought input on science goals. Two lunar surface experiments to study the theorised responses of a planetary body to gravitational waves were put forward in response to a call for proposals from ESA in 2020, with the Italian Gran Sasso Science Institute proposing the Lunar Gravitational-Wave Antenna and the French Astroparticle and Cosmology Laboratory proposing the Lunar Seismic and Gravitational Antenna. The Lunar Gravitational-Wave Antenna would leverage an array of highly sensitive seismometers on the surface of the Moon, to measure the response of the Moon to gravitational waves and to distinguish this signal from a seismic background.
