= Eotvos (unit) =

Unit of gravitational gradient

eotvos
- Unit system: non-SI metric unit
- Unit of: gravity gradient
- Symbol: E
- Named after: Loránd Eötvös
- Derivation: 10^{−9} Gal/cm

Conversions
1 E in ...	... is equal to ...
- CGS base units: 10^{−9} s^{−2}
- SI base units: 10^{−9} s^{−2}

The eotvos is a unit of gravitational field gradient that was used in conjunction with the older centimetre–gram–second system of units (CGS). The eotvos is defined as 10^{−9} gals per centimetre. The symbol of the eotvos unit is E.

In SI units and in CGS units, 1 eotvos is 10^{−9} second^{−2}. The eotvos unit is named for the physicist Loránd Eötvös, who made pioneering studies of the gradient of the Earth's gravitational field.

== Static sources ==
In free space, the gravitational gradient tensor has zero trace by Poisson's equation, so the sum of gravity gradient along any three perpendicular directions is 0.

Near the surface of earth, the equipotential surface is nearly spherical, following the near-spherical shape of earth. Thus, the gravity gradient tensor has its three principal directions: a tensile direction along the local vertical direction, and two compressive directions perpendicular to the local vertical direction. The vertical tensile component gradient is ~ 3,080 E (an elevation increase of 1 m gives a decrease of gravity of about 0.3 mGal). For a perfectly spherical earth, this value is theoretically $\vert \partial_r g \vert = {2GM}/{R^3} \approx 3080 ~\mathrm{E}$. Since the equipotential surface is nearly spherical, the two compressive gradients are roughly half of that, at ~ 1,540 E. Gravity gradiometry usually measures the perturbation away from this ideal value.

The effect of Earth's rotation creates an acceleration value of $\omega^2 R \cos\phi$, where $\omega$ is its angular velocity, and $\phi$ is the latitude. This perturbs the measured gradient. The maximal perturbation is obtained at the equator, with a value of $\omega^2 \approx 5 ~\mathrm{E}$.

Geological formations can modify the gradient. A mountain range, or an underground formation with increased density, is a large amount of mass that increases the tensile component of the gradient, and tilts the direction of tensile component towards the mass. An underground formation of decreased density, such as a salt dome or an oil formation, has the opposite effect.

In general, the gradiometric perturbation of a structure falls off as $d^{-3}$, so a structure of characteristic size $r$ buried $d$ underground produces roughly the same amount of perturbation at the ground surface as a structure of characteristic size $kr$ buried $kd$, for any $k > 0$.

Effect of structures on the gradient
Type of structure	Effect size (in E)	Reference
Earth's rotation	~ 5	theory
mountain ranges	~ 200	
shallow Texas salt domes	50–100	
aquifer, soil moisture, soil compaction	~ 30	
buildings, archeological sites	< 100	
a square 2×2 m pipe buried 0.5 m underground	~ 150	

== Measurement ==
The Eötvös torsion balance was used in the exploration for oil and gas reservoirs during the 1918–1940 period. It could achieve 1–3 E in accuracy, but requires up to 6 h per station. Modern (2013) airborne systems can reach 3–6 E in rms accuracy at integration time of ~ 6 seconds. Such a system achieves higher spatial resolution on slower aircraft, so the gradiometry maps have higher spatial resolution on zeppelins and helicopters than on fixed-wing aircraft. Spatial resolution is also higher for lower-flying aircraft.

Sensitivity of instruments
Year	Type of instrument	Reading time	Sensitivity (in E)	Reference
1918–1940	Eötvös torsion balance	6 hours	1–3	
2012	airborne systems	6 seconds	3–6	
2022	matter wave Mach–Zehnder interferometry	10 minutes	20	

== See also ==
- Gravimetry
