= Loránd Eötvös =

Hungarian physicist (1848–1919)

Baron Loránd Eötvös de Vásárosnamény
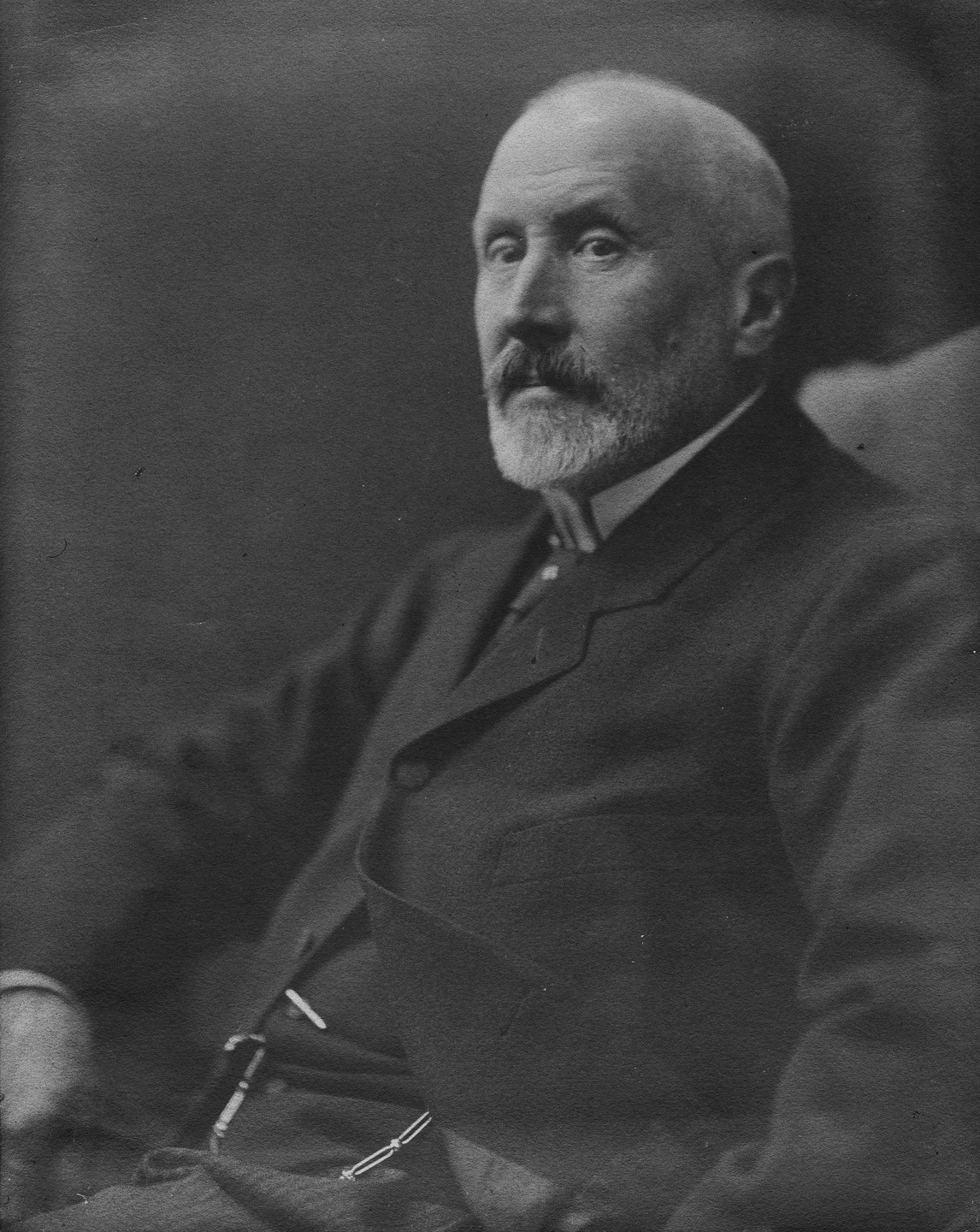
- Portrait by Aladár Székely (1918)

Minister of Religion and Education of the Kingdom of Hungary
- In office 10 June 1894 – 15 January 1895
- Prime Minister: Sándor Wekerle
- Preceded by: Albin Csáky
- Succeeded by: Gyula Wlassics

President of the Hungarian Academy of Sciences
- In office 3 May 1889 – 5 October 1905
- Preceded by: Ágoston Trefort
- Succeeded by: Albert Berzeviczy

Personal details
- Born: 27 July 1848 Buda, Kingdom of Hungary, Habsburg Empire
- Died: 8 April 1919 (aged 70) Budapest, Kingdom of Hungary Austria-Hungary
- Resting place: Fiume Road Graveyard, Budapest
- Party: Liberal Party
- Spouse: Gizella Horvát
- Children: 3
- Parents: József Eötvös (father); Ágnes Rosty (mother)
- Education: Heidelberg University (PhD)
- Occupation: Physicist; politician
- Known for: Eötvös effect Eötvös experiment Eötvös number Eötvös rule

Baron Loránd Eötvös de Vásárosnamény (or simply Loránd Eötvös /ˈɜːrtvɔːs/; Hungarian: [ˈloːraːnd ˈøtvøʃ]; Hungarian: vásárosnaményi báró Eötvös Loránd Ágoston; 27 July 1848 – 8 April 1919), also called Baron Roland von Eötvös in English literature, was a Hungarian physicist and politician. He is remembered today largely for his work on gravitation and surface tension, and the invention of the torsion pendulum.

In addition to Eötvös Loránd University and the Eötvös Loránd Institute of Geophysics in Hungary, the Eötvös crater on the Moon, the asteroid 12301 Eötvös and the mineral lorándite also bear his name, as well as a peak (Cima Eotvos) in the Dolomites.

== Life ==
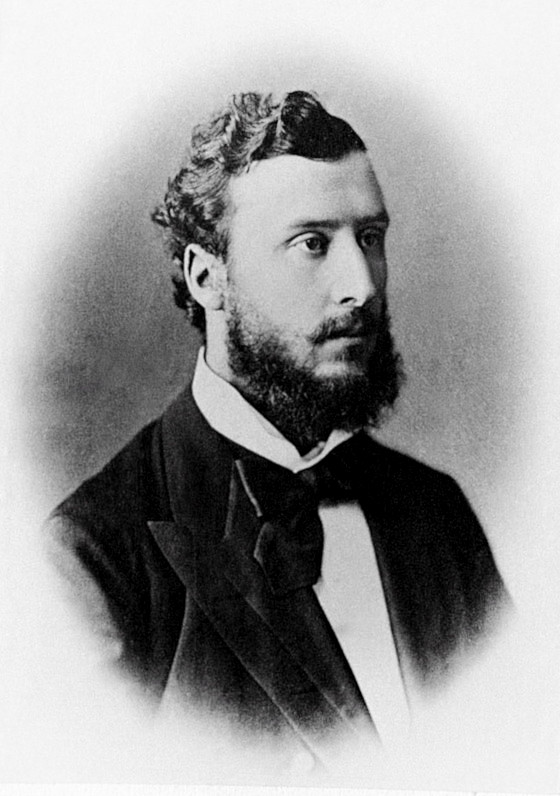
Loránd Eötvös

Born in 1848, the year of the Hungarian revolution, Eötvös was the son of the Baron József Eötvös de Vásárosnamény (1813–1871), a well-known poet, writer, and liberal politician, who was cabinet minister at the time, and played an important part in 19th century Hungarian intellectual and political life. His mother was the Hungarian noble lady Agnes Rosty de Barkócz (1825–1913), member of the illustrious noble family Rosty de Barkócz that originally hailed from the Vas county, and through this, he descended from the ancient medieval Hungarian noble Perneszy family, which died out in the 18th century. Loránd's uncle was Pál Rosty de Barkócz (1830–1874) was a Hungarian nobleman, photographer, and explorer, who visited Texas, New Mexico, Mexico, Cuba and Venezuela between 1857 and 1859. Alexandru Roman, professor of Romanian linguistics at the University of Budapest, claimed that a relative of Eötvös told him that his Eötvös' ancestor was an Aromanian silversmith (Eötvös means silversmith in Hungarian) who moved to Hungary in the early 18th-century.

Loránd Eötvös first studied law, but soon switched to physics and went abroad to study in Heidelberg and Königsberg. After earning his doctorate, he became a university professor in Budapest and played a leading part in Hungarian science for almost half a century. He gained international recognition first by his innovative work on capillarity, then by his refined experimental methods and extensive field studies in gravity.

Eötvös is remembered today for his experimental work on gravity, in particular his study of the equivalence of gravitational and inertial mass (the so-called weak equivalence principle) and his study of the gravitational gradient on the Earth's surface. The weak equivalence principle plays a prominent role in relativity theory and the Eötvös experiment was cited by Albert Einstein in his 1916 paper The Foundation of the General Theory of Relativity. Measurements of the gravitational gradient are important in applied geophysics, such as the location of petroleum deposits. The CGS unit for gravitational gradient is named the eotvos in his honor.

From 1886 until his death, Loránd Eötvös researched and taught in the University of Budapest, which in 1950 was renamed after him (Eötvös Loránd University).

== Torsion balance ==
A variation of the earlier invention, the torsion balance in the Eötvös experiment, the Eötvös pendulum, designed by Eötvös, is a sensitive instrument for measuring the density of underlying rock strata. The device measures not only the direction of force of gravity, but the change in the force of gravity's extent in the horizontal plane. It determines the distribution of masses in the Earth's crust. The Eötvös torsion balance, an important instrument of geodesy and geophysics throughout the whole world, studies the Earth's physical properties. It is used for mine exploration, and also in the search for minerals, such as oil, coal and ores. The Eötvös pendulum was never patented, but after the demonstration of its accuracy and numerous visits to Hungary from abroad, several instruments were exported worldwide, and the richest oilfields in the United States were discovered by using it. The Eötvös pendulum was used to prove the equivalence of the inertial mass and the gravitational mass accurately, as a response to the offer of a prize. This equivalence was used later by Albert Einstein in setting out the theory of general relativity.

This is how Eötvös describes his balance:

It was just a simple, straight stick that I used as instrument, specially loaded at both ends, enclosed into a metal sheath to protect it from the wind and temperature changes. Upon this stick every single mass, be it near or far, exerts a directing force; but the wire upon which it hangs resists, and whilst resisting it twists, with the degree of this twist showing us the exact magnitude of the forces acting upon the stick. This is a Coulomb balance, and that is all there is to it. It is simple, like the flute of Hamlet, you only have to know how to play on it, and just like the musician who can delight you with splendid variations, the physicist can, on this balance, with no less delight determine the finest variations of gravity. This way we can peer into such depth of the crust of the Earth, that neither our eyes, nor our longest drills could reach.

One of Eötvös' assistants who later became a noted scientist was Radó von Kövesligethy.

== Honors ==
To honor Eötvös, a postage stamp was issued by Hungary on 1 July 1932. Another stamp was issued on 27 July 1948 to commemorate the centenary of the birth of the physicist. Hungary issued a postage stamp on 31 January 1991.

== See also ==
- Eotvos, a unit of gravitational gradient
- List of geophysicists
- Lorándite, a mineral named after Loránd Eötvös

Political offices
Preceded by Albin Csáky	Minister of Religion and Education; 1894–1895	Succeeded by Gyula Wlassics
Cultural offices
Preceded by Ágoston Trefort	President of the Hungarian Academy of Sciences; 1889–1905	Succeeded by Albert Berzeviczy
