= CoRoT-2 =

Star in the constellation Aquila

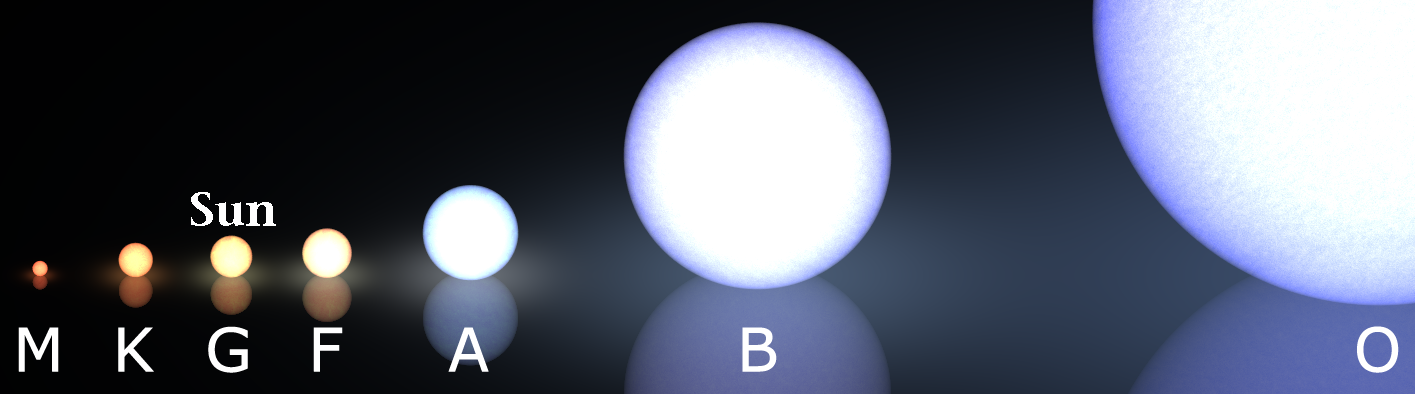
- CoRoT-2 is a G7V class star somewhat less massive than the Sun (G2V)

Observation data Epoch J2000.0 Equinox ICRS
- Constellation: Aquila
- Right ascension: 19^{h} 27^{m} 06.4944^{s}
- Declination: +01° 23′ 01.360″
- Apparent magnitude (V): 12.57

Characteristics
- Evolutionary stage: main sequence
- Spectral type: G7V
- Apparent magnitude (V): ~12.577
- Apparent magnitude (I): 11.49 ±0.03
- Apparent magnitude (J): 10.5783 ±0.028
- Apparent magnitude (H): 10.44 ±0.04
- Apparent magnitude (K): 10.31 ±0.03

Astrometry
| Proper motion (μ) | RA: −3.360(16) mas/yr Dec.: −11.101(12) mas/yr |
| Parallax (π) | 4.6895±0.0143 mas |
| Distance | 696 ± 2 ly (213.2 ± 0.7 pc) |

Details
| Mass | 0.97 M_{☉} |
| Radius | 0.94 R_{☉} |
| Surface gravity (log g) | 4.48 cgs |
| Temperature | 5,529 K |
| Metallicity | −0.04 |
| Rotation | 4.542 d |
| Rotational velocity (v sin i) | 10.2 km/s |
| Age | 5.2 Gyr |

Other designations
- TOI-5796, GSC 00465-01282, 2MASS J19270649+0123013, DENIS J192706.4+012301, Gaia DR3 4287820848378092672

Database references
| SIMBAD | data |

CoRoT-2 is a yellow dwarf main sequence star a little cooler than the Sun. This star is located approximately 700 light-years away in the constellation of Aquila. The apparent magnitude of this star is 12, which means it is not visible to the naked eye but can be seen with a medium-sized amateur telescope on a clear dark night.

It has a true physical companion, 2MASS J19270636+0122577, with a spectral type of K9, as earlier hypothesized by Alonso et al. (2008), making CoRoT-2 a wide binary system with at least one planet.

== Planetary system ==
This star is home to exoplanet CoRoT-2b discovered by the CoRoT Mission spacecraft using the transit method. CoRoT-2b (formerly known as CoRoT-Exo-2b) is the second extrasolar planet to be detected by the French-led CoRoT mission, and orbits the star CoRoT-2 at a distance of 930 light years from Earth towards the constellation Aquila. Its discovery was announced on 20 December 2007. After its discovery via the transit method, its mass was confirmed via the radial velocity method.

The radial velocity trend of CoRoT-2, caused by the presence of CoRoT-2 b.

The planet is a large hot Jupiter, about 1.43 times the radius of Jupiter and approximately 3.3 times as massive. Its huge size is due to the intense heating from its parent star, which causes the outer layers of its atmosphere to bloat. The extremely large radius of the planet indicates that CoRoT-2b is really hot, estimated to be around 1500 K, even hotter than would be expected given its location close to its parent star. This fact may be a sign of tidal heating due to interactions with another planet. At Jupiter-like distances its radius would roughly be the same as Jupiter. The complete phase curve of this planet has been observed.

CoRoT-2b orbits its star approximately once every 1.7 days, and orbits the star in a prograde direction close to the star's equator. Its parent star is a G-type star, a bit cooler than the Sun but more active. It is located about 800 light-years from Earth.

It takes 125 minutes to transit its star.

As of August 2008, the CoRoT-2b spin-orbit angle (that is, the angle between the equator of the star and the plane of the planet orbit) was calculated by Bouchy et al. by means of the Rossiter–McLaughlin effect with a value of +7.2 ± 4.5 degrees.

The CoRoT-2 planetary system
| Companion (in order from star) | Mass | Semimajor axis (AU) | Orbital period (days) | Eccentricity | Inclination (°) | Radius |
|---|---|---|---|---|---|---|
| b | 3.31±0.16 M_{J} | 0.0281±0.0009 | 1.74299705(15) d | 0 | — | 1.429±0.047 R_{J} |

== See also ==
- List of extrasolar planets
