= Gravimetry =

Measurement of the strength of a gravitational field

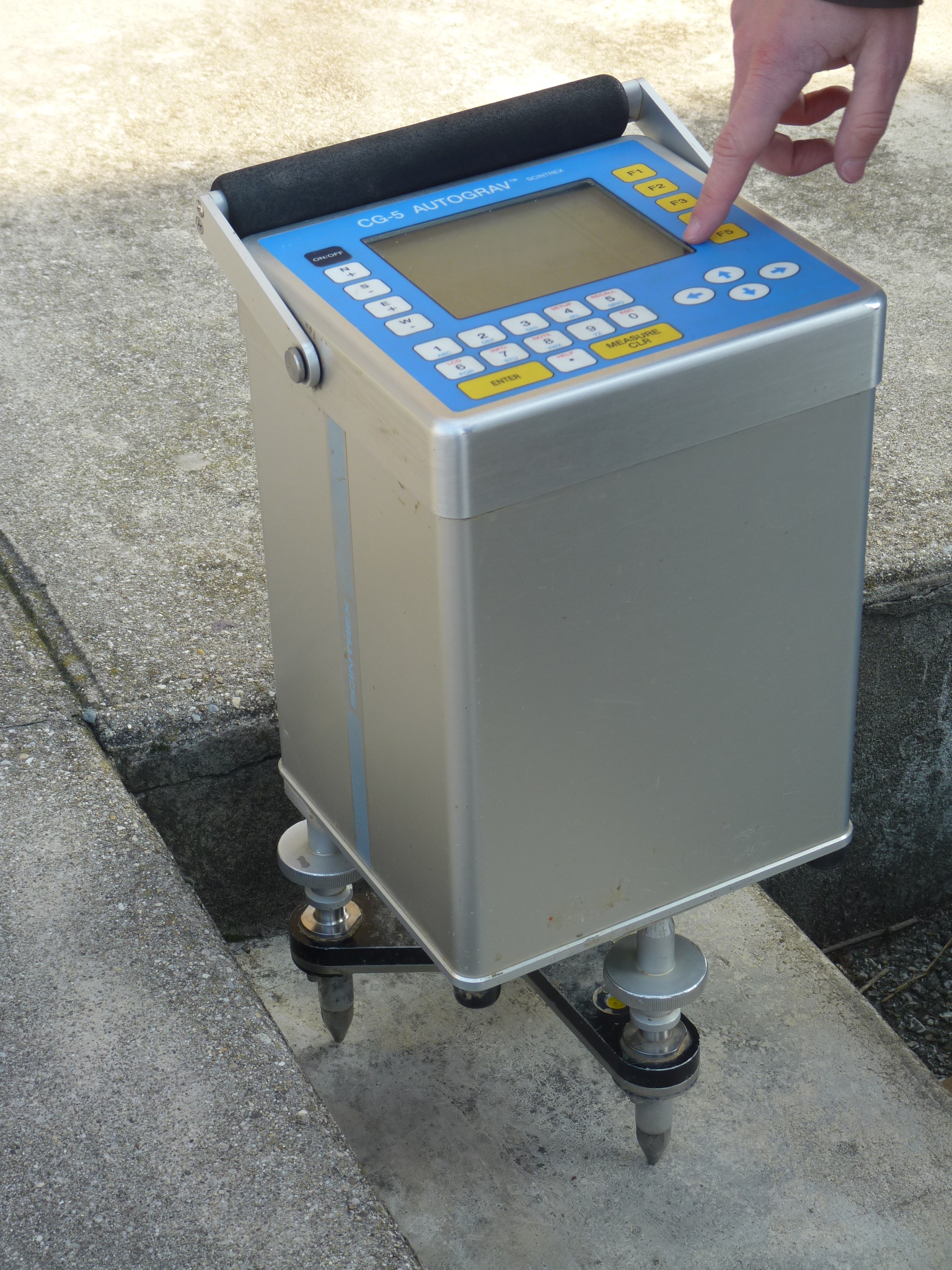
An Autograv CG-5 gravimeter being operated

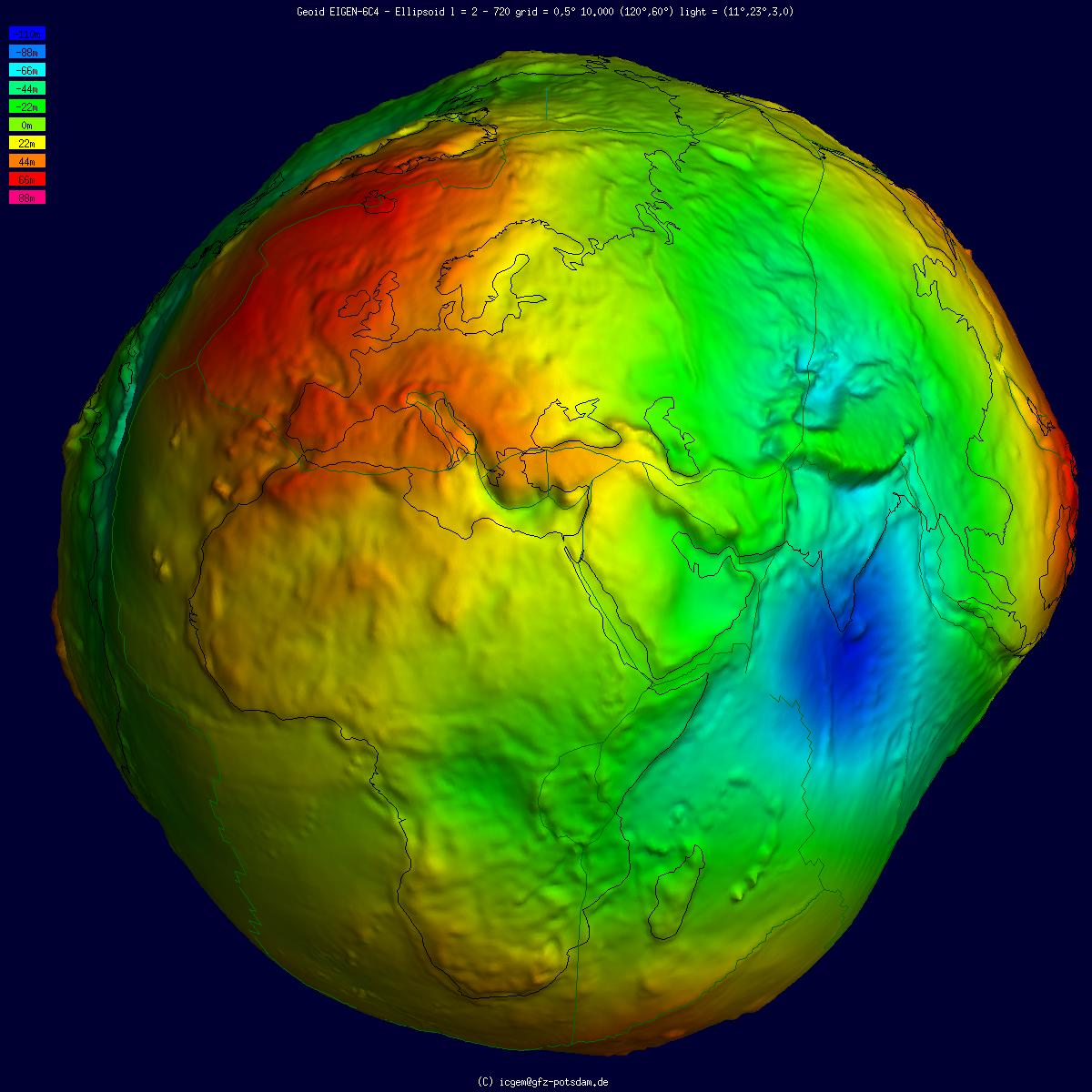
Geoid undulations based on satellite gravimetry

Gravimetry is the measurement of the strength of a gravitational field. Gravimetry may be used when either the magnitude of a gravitational field or the properties of matter responsible for its creation are of interest. The study of gravity changes belongs to geodynamics.

== Units of measurement ==
Gravity is usually measured in units of acceleration. In the SI system of units, the standard unit of acceleration is metres per second squared (m/s^{2}). Other units include the cgs gal (sometimes known as a galileo, in either case with symbol Gal), which equals 1 centimetre per second squared, and the g (g_{n}), equal to 9.80665 m/s^{2}. The value of the g_{n} is defined as approximately equal to the acceleration due to gravity at the Earth's surface, although the actual acceleration varies slightly by location.

== Gravimeters ==
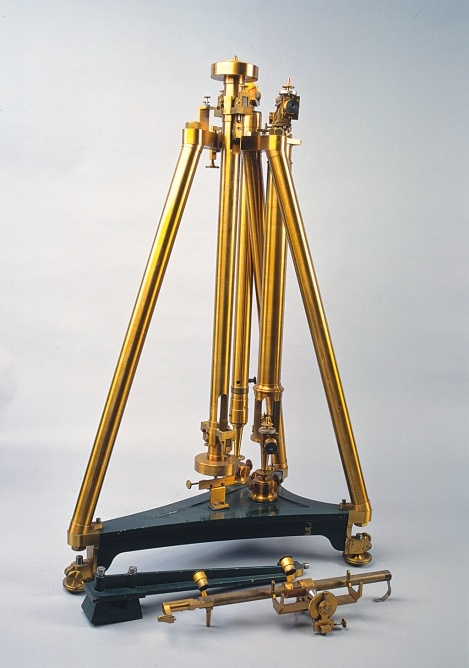
Gravimeter with variant of Repsold–Bessel pendulum

A gravimeter is an instrument used to measure gravitational acceleration. Every mass has an associated gravitational potential. The gradient of this potential is a force. A gravimeter measures this gravitational force.

For a small body, general relativity predicts gravitational effects indistinguishable from the effects of acceleration by the equivalence principle. Thus, gravimeters can be regarded as special-purpose accelerometers. Many weighing scales may be regarded as simple gravimeters. In one common form, a spring is used to counteract the force of gravity pulling on an object. The change in length of the spring may be calibrated to the force required to balance the gravitational pull. The resulting measurement may be made in units of force (such as the newton), however, gravimeters display their measurements in units of gals (cm/s^{2}), (Note: Some newer units are pm/s^{2} (picometers per second squared), fm/s^{2} (femto), am/s^{2} (atto) for very sensitive instruments.) and parts per million, parts per billion, or parts per trillion of the average vertical acceleration with respect to the Earth.

Though similar in design to other accelerometers, gravimeters are typically designed to be much more sensitive. Their first uses were to measure the changes in gravity from the varying densities and distribution of masses inside the Earth, from temporal tidal variations in the shape and distribution of mass in the oceans, atmosphere and Earth.

The resolution of gravimeters can be increased by averaging samples over longer periods. Fundamental characteristics of gravimeters are the accuracy of a single measurement (a single sample) and the sampling rate.

$\text{Resolution} = {\text{SingleMeasurementResolution} \over \sqrt \text{NumberOfSamples}}$ (Note: Assumes measurement noise is independent of the measurement.)

For example:

$$\text{Resolution per minute} = {\text{Resolution per second} \over \sqrt {60}}$$

Besides precision, stability is also an important property for a gravimeter as it allows the monitoring of gravity changes. These changes can be the result of mass displacements inside the Earth, or of vertical movements of the Earth's crust on which measurements are being made. (Note: Near the Earth's surface gravity decreases 0.308 mGal for every metre of height.)

The first gravimeters were vertical accelerometers, specialized for measuring the constant downward acceleration of gravity on the Earth's surface. The Earth's vertical gravity varies from place to place over its surface by about ±0.5%. It varies by about ±1000 nm/s^{2} (nanometers per second squared) at any location because of the changing positions of the Sun and Moon relative to the Earth.

The majority of modern gravimeters use specially designed metal or quartz zero-length springs to support the test mass. The special property of these springs is that the natural resonant period of oscillation of the spring–mass system can be made very long – approaching a thousand seconds. This detunes the test mass from most local vibration and mechanical noise, increasing the sensitivity and utility of the gravimeter. Quartz and metal springs are chosen for different reasons; quartz springs are less affected by magnetic and electric fields, while metal springs have a much lower drift due to elongation over time. The test mass is sealed in an air-tight container so that tiny changes in barometric pressure from blowing wind and other weather do not change the buoyancy of the test mass in air. Spring gravimeters are, in practice, relative instruments that measure the difference in gravity between different locations. A relative instrument also requires calibration by comparing instrument readings taken at locations with known absolute values of gravity.

Absolute gravimeters provide such measurements by determining the gravitational acceleration of a test mass in a vacuum. A test mass is allowed to fall freely inside a vacuum chamber and its position is measured with a laser interferometer and timed with an atomic clock. The laser wavelength is known to ±0.025 ppb and the clock is stable to ±0.03 ppb. Care must be taken to minimize the effects of perturbing forces such as residual air resistance (even in a vacuum), vibration, and magnetic forces. Such instruments are capable of an accuracy of about 2 ppb or 0.002 mGal and reference their measurement to atomic standards of length and time. Their primary use is for calibrating relative instruments, monitoring crustal deformation, and in geophysical studies requiring high accuracy and stability. However, absolute instruments are somewhat larger and significantly more expensive than relative spring gravimeters and are thus relatively rare.

Relative gravimeter usually refer to comparisons of gravity from one place to another. They are designed to subtract the average vertical gravity automatically. They can be calibrated at a location where the gravity is known accurately and then transported to where gravity is to be measured. Or they can be calibrated in absolute units at their operating location.

=== Applications ===
Researchers use more sophisticated gravimeters when precise measurements are needed. When measuring Earth's gravitational field, measurements are made to the precision of microgals to find density variations in the rocks making up the Earth. Several types of gravimeters exist for making these measurements, including some that are essentially refined versions of the spring scale described above. These measurements are used to quantify gravity anomalies.

Gravimeters can detect vibrations and gravity changes from human activities. Depending on the interests of the researcher or operator, this might be counteracted by integral vibration isolation and signal processing.

Gravimeters have been designed to mount in vehicles, including aircraft (note the field of aerogravity), ships and submarines. These special gravimeters isolate acceleration from the vehicle's movement and subtract it from measurements. The acceleration of the vehicles is often hundreds or thousands of times stronger than the changes in gravity being measured.

The Lunar Surface Gravimeter was deployed on the surface of the Moon during the 1972 Apollo 17 mission but did not work due to a design error. A second device carried on the same mission, the Lunar Traverse Gravimeter, functioned as anticipated.

Gravimeters are used for petroleum and mineral prospecting, seismology, geodesy, geophysical surveys and other geophysical research, and for metrology. Their fundamental purpose is to map the gravity field in space and time.

Most current work is Earth-based, with a few satellites around Earth, but gravimeters are also applicable to the Moon, Sun, planets, asteroids, stars, galaxies and other bodies. Gravitational wave experiments monitor the changes with time in the gravitational potential itself, rather than the gradient of the potential that the gravimeter is tracking. This distinction is somewhat arbitrary. The subsystems of the gravitational radiation experiments are very sensitive to changes in the gradient of the potential. The local gravity signals on Earth that interfere with gravitational wave experiments are disparagingly referred to as "Newtonian noise", since Newtonian gravity calculations are sufficient to characterize many of the local (Earth-based) signals.

=== Commercial absolute gravimeters ===
Illustration of the effects of different underground geological features on the local gravity field. A volume of low density, 2, reduces g, while high-density material, 3, increases g.

A common type of portable gravimeter measures the acceleration of small masses free falling in a vacuum while the accelerometer is firmly attached to the ground. The mass includes a retroreflector and terminates one arm of a Michelson interferometer. By counting and timing the interference fringes, the acceleration of the mass can be measured. A more recent development is a rise and fall version that tosses the mass upward and measures both upward and downward motion. This allows cancellation of some measurement errors.

Absolute gravimeters are used in the calibration of relative gravimeters, surveying for gravity anomalies (e.g. voids), and for establishing the vertical geodetic control network.

Atom interferometric and atomic fountain methods are used for precise measurement of the Earth's gravity, and atomic clocks and purpose-built instruments can use time dilation measurements to track changes in the gravitational potential and gravitational acceleration on the Earth.

=== Relative gravimeters ===
The most common gravimeters are spring-based. They are used in gravity surveys over large areas for establishing the figure of the geoid over those areas. They are basically a weight on a spring, and by measuring the amount by which the weight stretches the spring, local gravity can be measured. However, the strength of the spring must be calibrated by placing the instrument in a location with a known gravitational acceleration.

The current standard for sensitive gravimeters are the superconducting gravimeters (SGs), which operate by suspending a superconducting niobium sphere in an extremely stable magnetic field; the current required to generate the magnetic field that suspends the niobium sphere is proportional to the strength of the Earth's gravitational acceleration. The superconducting gravimeter achieves sensitivities of 10^{–11} m·s^{−2} (one nanogal), approximately one trillionth (10^{−12}) of the Earth surface gravity. In a demonstration of the sensitivity of the SG, Virtanen (2006), describes how an instrument at Metsähovi, Finland, detected the gradual increase in surface gravity as workmen cleared snow from its laboratory roof.

The largest component of the signal recorded by an SG is the tidal gravity of the Sun and Moon acting at the station. This is roughly ±1000 nm/s^{2} (nanometers per second squared) at most locations. SGs can detect and characterize Earth tides, changes in the density of the atmosphere, the effect of changes in the shape of the surface of the ocean, the effect of the atmosphere's pressure on the Earth, changes in the rate of rotation of the Earth, oscillations of the Earth's core, distant and nearby seismic events, and more.

Many of the broadband three-axis seismometers in common use are sensitive enough to track the Sun and Moon. When operated to report acceleration, they are useful gravimeters. Because they have three axes, it is possible to solve for their position and orientation by either tracking the arrival time and pattern of seismic waves from earthquakes, or by referencing them to the Sun and Moon tidal gravity.

Recently, the SGs and broadband three-axis seismometers operated in gravimeter mode have begun to detect and characterize the small gravity signals from earthquakes. These signals arrive at the gravimeter at the speed of light, so have the potential to improve earthquake early warning methods. There is some activity to design purpose-built gravimeters of sufficient sensitivity and bandwidth to detect these prompt gravity signals from earthquakes.

Newer MEMS gravimeters, atom gravimeters, offer the potential for low-cost arrays of sensors. MEMS gravimeters are currently variations on spring-type accelerometers where the motions of a tiny cantilever or mass are tracked to report acceleration. Much of the research is focused on different methods of detecting the position and movements of these small masses. In atom gravimeters, the mass is a collection of atoms.

Transportable relative gravimeters also exist; they employ an extremely stable inertial platform to compensate for the masking effects of motion and vibration, a difficult engineering feat. The first transportable relative gravimeters were, reportedly, a secret military technology developed in the 1950–1960s as a navigational aid for nuclear submarines. Subsequently, in the 1980s, transportable relative gravimeters were reverse engineered by the civilian sector for use on ships, then in air and finally satellite-borne gravity surveys.

== Microgravimetry ==
Microgravimetry is an important branch developed on the foundation of classical gravimetry. Microgravity investigations are carried out in order to solve various problems of engineering geology, mainly locating voids and their monitoring. Very detailed measurements of high accuracy can indicate voids of any origin, provided the size and depth are large enough to produce a measurable gravity effect.

== History ==
Jean Richer was the first person to observe a change in gravitational force over the surface of the Earth.

The modern gravimeter was developed by Lucien LaCoste and Arnold Romberg in 1936. They also invented most subsequent refinements, including the ship-mounted gravimeter in 1965, temperature-resistant instruments for deep boreholes, and lightweight hand-carried instruments. Most of their designs remain in use with refinements in data collection and data processing.

== Satellite gravimetry ==
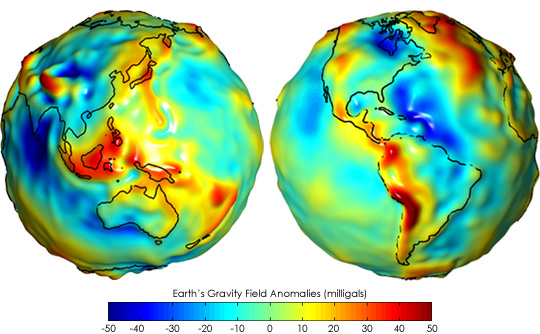
Gravity anomaly map from GRACE

Currently, the static and time-variable Earth's gravity field parameters are determined using modern satellite missions, such as GOCE, CHAMP, Swarm, GRACE and GRACE-FO. The lowest-degree parameters, including the Earth's oblateness and geocenter motion are best determined with satellite laser ranging.

Large-scale gravity anomalies can be detected from space, as a by-product of satellite gravity missions. The satellite missions aim at the generation of a detailed gravity field model of the Earth, typically presented in the form of a spherical-harmonic expansion of the Earth's gravitational potential, but alternative presentations, such as maps of geoid undulations or gravity anomalies, are also produced.

Gravity Recovery and Climate Experiment (GRACE) consisted of two satellites that detected gravitational changes across the Earth. These changes could be presented as gravity anomaly temporal variations. Gravity Recovery and Interior Laboratory (GRAIL) also consisted of two spacecraft orbiting the Moon for three years before their deorbit in 2015.

== See also ==
- Kater's pendulum – Gravity measurement with pendulums
- Kibble balance § Effect of gravity
- Felix Andries Vening Meinesz – Dutch geophysicist and geodesist
- Geophysical survey – Systematic collection of geophysical data for spatial studies
- Gravity Field and Steady-State Ocean Circulation Explorer (GOCE) – A modern satellite-borne gradiometer containing pairs of gravimeters (accelerometers), launched March 2009
- Gravity map
- Gravity of Earth
- Gravity gradiometry – Measurement of variations in Earth's gravitational field
- GRACE and GRACE-FO – Spacecraft launched March 2002
- Physical geodesy – Study of the physical properties of the Earth's gravity field
