= Gravity gradiometry =

Measurement of variations in Earth's gravitational field

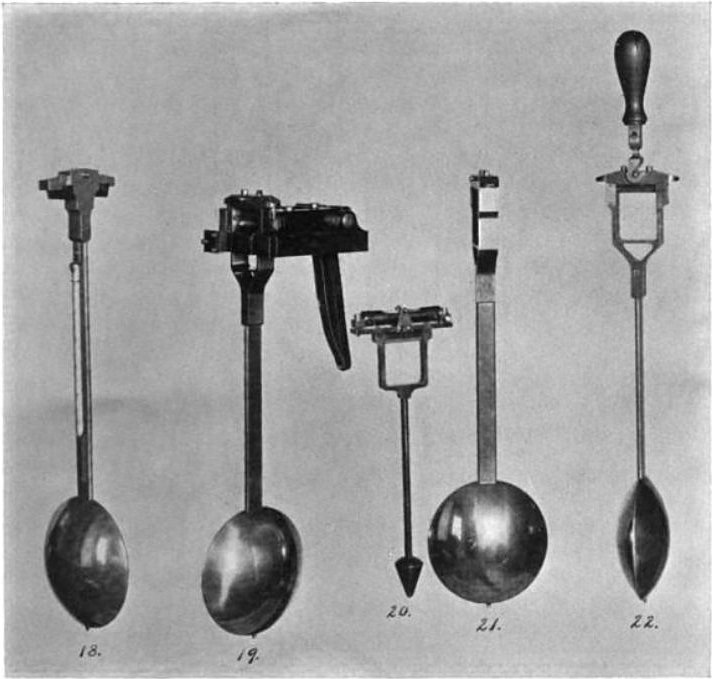
Pendulums used in Mendenhall gravimeter apparatus, from 1897 scientific journal

Gravity gradiometry is the study of variations (anomalies) in the Earth's gravity field via measurements of the spatial gradient of gravitational acceleration. The gravity gradient tensor is a 3 × 3 tensor; it is given in coordinates by the Jacobian matrix of the acceleration vector ($g=[g_x g_y g_z]^\text{T}$), totaling 9 scalar quantities:

$$G=\nabla g = \begin{bmatrix}
\partial{g_x}/\partial{x} & \partial{g_x}/\partial{y} & \partial{g_x}/\partial{z}\\
\partial{g_y}/\partial{x} & \partial{g_y}/\partial{y} & \partial{g_y}/\partial{z}\\
\partial{g_z}/\partial{x} & \partial{g_z}/\partial{y} & \partial{g_z}/\partial{z}
\end{bmatrix}$$

It has dimension of square reciprocal time, in units of s^{−2} (or m⋅m^{−1}⋅s^{−2}).

Gravity gradiometry is used by oil and mineral prospectors to measure the density of the subsurface, effectively by measuring the rate of change of gravitational acceleration due to underlying rock properties. From this information it is possible to build a picture of subsurface anomalies which can then be used to more accurately target oil, gas and mineral deposits. It is also used to image water column density, when locating submerged objects, or determining water depth (bathymetry). Physical scientists use gravimeters to determine the exact size and shape of the earth and they contribute to the gravity compensations applied to inertial navigation systems.

== Gravity gradient ==
Gravity measurements are a reflection of the earth's gravitational attraction, its centripetal force, tidal accelerations due to the sun, moon, and planets, and other applied forces. Gravity gradiometers measure the spatial derivatives of the gravity vector. The most frequently used and intuitive component is the vertical gravity gradient, G_{zz}, which represents the rate of change of vertical gravity (g_{z}) with height (z). It can be deduced by differencing the value of gravity at two points separated by a small vertical distance, l, and dividing by this distance.

$$G_{zz} = {\partial g_z\over \partial z} \approx {g_z \bigl(z + \tfrac \ell 2 \bigr) - g_z \bigl(z - \tfrac \ell 2 \bigr )\over \ell}$$

The two gravity measurements are provided by accelerometers which are matched and aligned to a high level of accuracy.

=== Unit ===
The unit of gravity gradient is the eotvos (symbol E), which is 10^{−9} s^{−2} (10^{−4} mGal/m). A person at a distance of 2 metres would provide a gravity gradient signal approximately one E. Mountains can give signals of several hundred eotvos.

=== Gravity gradient tensor ===
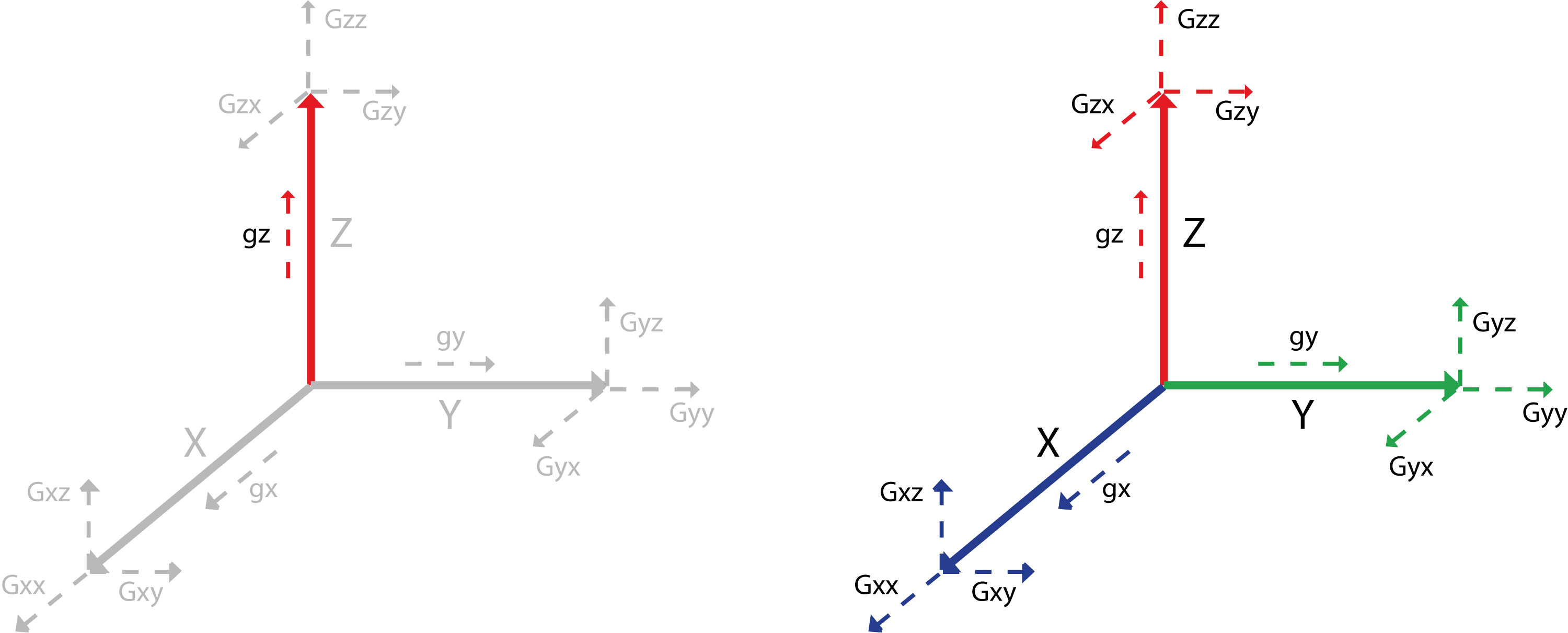
Fig 1. Conventional gravity measures only the three components of the gravitational field vector, full tensor gravity gradiometry additionally measures the components of the gravity field gradient (RHS).

Full tensor gradiometers measure the rate of change of the gravity vector in all three perpendicular directions giving rise to a gravity gradient tensor (Fig 1).

Let $V$ be the gravitational field potential (defined up to an additive constant). The gravitational field vector field is $-\nabla V$, and the gravity gradient tensor field is the second derivative $\Gamma := -\nabla^2 V$.

In general, a second-order tensor in $\R^3$ has 9 free variables, but because $-\nabla^2 V$ is symmetric, it has only 6 free variables. Furthermore, by the Poisson equation, $\operatorname{Tr} \Gamma = 4\pi G \rho$, so in free space, $\operatorname{Tr} \Gamma = 0$, leaving only 5 free variables. In particular, this means that when the equipment performing the gradiometry is in air or vacuum, which is almost always the case, the full gravity gradient tensor $\Gamma$ needs to measure only 5 numbers.

== Comparison to gravity ==
Being the derivatives of gravity, the spectral power of gravity gradient signals is pushed to higher frequencies. This generally makes the gravity gradient anomaly more localised to the source than the gravity anomaly. The table (below) and graph (Fig 2) compare the g_{z} and G_{zz} responses from a point source.

	Gravity (g_{z})	Gravity gradient (G_{zz})
Signal	${GM\,z \over (r^2 + z^2)^{3/2}}$	${GM (r^2 - 2z^2) \over (r^2 + z^2)^{5/2}}$
Peak signal (r = 0)	${GM \over z^2}$	${2GM \over z^3}$
Full width at half maximum	$1.53 \, z$	$\approx z$
Wavelength (λ)	$3.07 \, z$	$2 \, z$

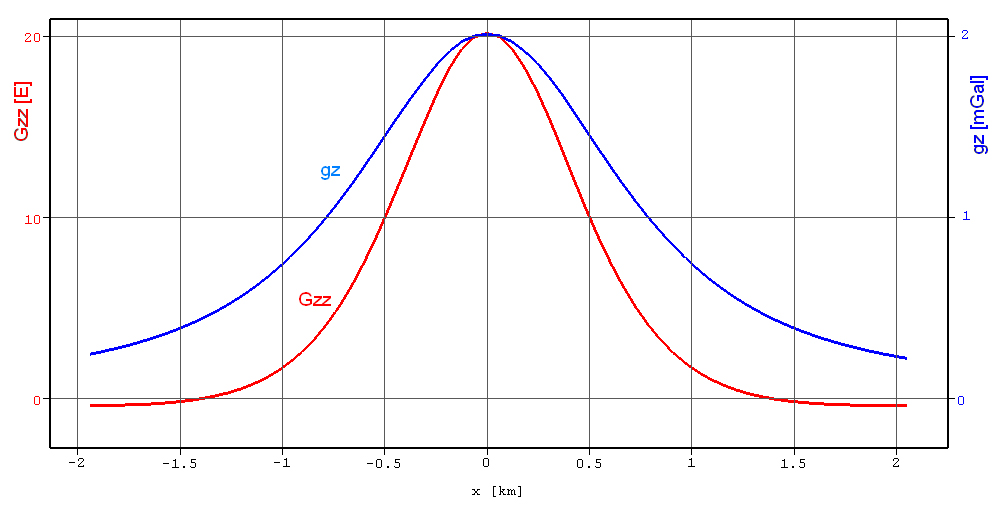
Fig 2. Vertical gravity and gravity gradient signals from a point source buried at 1 km depth

Conversely, gravity measurements have more signal power at low frequency therefore making them more sensitive to regional signals and deeper sources.

== Dynamic survey environments (airborne and marine) ==
The derivative measurement sacrifices the overall energy in the signal, but significantly reduces the noise due to motional disturbance. On a moving platform, the acceleration disturbance measured by the two accelerometers is the same so that when forming the difference, it cancels in the gravity gradient measurement. This is the principal reason for deploying gradiometers in airborne and marine surveys where the acceleration levels are orders of magnitude greater than the signals of interest. The signal to noise ratio benefits most at high frequency (above 0.01 Hz), where the airborne acceleration noise is largest.

== Applications ==
Gravity gradiometry has predominately been used to image subsurface geology to aid hydrocarbon and mineral exploration. Over 2.5 million line kilometres has now been surveyed using the technique. The surveys highlight gravity anomalies that can be related to geological features such as Salt diapirs, Fault systems, Reef structures, Kimberlite pipes, etc. Other applications include tunnel and bunker detection and the recent GOCE mission that aims to improve the knowledge of ocean circulation.

== Gravity gradiometers ==
=== Lockheed Martin gravity gradiometers ===
During the 1970s, as an executive in the US Dept. of Defense, John Brett initiated the development of the gravity gradiometer to support the Trident II system. A committee was commissioned to seek commercial applications for the Full Tensor Gradient (FTG) system that was developed by Bell Aerospace (later acquired by Lockheed Martin) and was being deployed on US Navy Ohio-class Trident submarines designed to aid covert navigation. As the Cold War came to a close, the US Navy released the classified technology and opened the door for full commercialization of the technology. The existence of the gravity gradiometer was famously exposed in the film The Hunt for Red October released in 1990.

There are two types of Lockheed Martin gravity gradiometers currently in operation: the 3D Full Tensor Gravity Gradiometer (FTG; deployed in either a fixed wing aircraft or a ship) and the FALCON gradiometer (a partial tensor system with 8 accelerometers and deployed in a fixed wing aircraft or a helicopter). The 3D FTG system contains three gravity gradiometry instruments (GGIs), each consisting of two opposing pairs of accelerometers arranged on a spinning disc with measurement direction in the spin direction.

=== Other gravity gradiometers ===
Electrostatic gravity gradiometer
This is the gravity gradiometer deployed on the European Space Agency's GOCE mission. It is a three-axis diagonal gradiometer based on three pairs of electrostatic servo-controlled accelerometers.
ARKeX Exploration gravity gradiometer
An evolution of technology originally developed for European Space Agency, the Exploration Gravity Gradiometer (EGG), developed by ARKeX (a corporation that is now defunct), uses two key principles of superconductivity to deliver its performance: the Meissner effect, which provides levitation of the EGG proof masses and flux quantization, which gives the EGG its inherent stability. The EGG has been specifically designed for high dynamic survey environments.
Ribbon sensor gradiometer
The Gravitec gravity gradiometer sensor consists of a single sensing element (a ribbon) that responds to gravity gradient forces. It is designed for borehole applications.
UWA gravity gradiometer
The University of Western Australia (a.k.a. VK-1) Gravity Gradiometer is a superconducting instrument which uses an orthogonal quadrupole responder (OQR) design based on pairs of micro-flexure supported balance beams.
Gedex gravity gradiometer
The Gedex gravity gradiometer (AKA High-Definition Airborne Gravity Gradiometer, HD-AGG) is also a superconducting OQR-type gravity gradiometer, based on technology developed at the University of Maryland.
iCORUS gravity gradiometer
The iCORUS gravity gradiometer is a strapdown airborne gravity gradiometer, based on technology developed at iMAR Navigation in Germany.
Quantum Technology gravity gradiometers
Quantum Technology gravity gradiometers based on atom interferometry are currently under development by a number of universities world wide and are beginning to be used in practical applications.

== See also ==
- Gravity-gradient stabilization – Method for the stabilization and the orientation of various spacecraft
- Gravity map
- Robert L. Forward – American physicist and writer (1932–2002)
- Accelerometer – Device that measures proper acceleration
- Equivalence principle – Hypothesis that inertial and gravitational masses are equivalent
- Gravimetry – Measurement of the strength of a gravitational field
- Eotvos (unit) – Unit of gravitational gradient
- Instrumentation – Measuring instruments which monitor and control a process
