= Ashwin Seshia =

Professor, scientist, and engineer

- Engineering career
- Employer: University of Cambridge
- Significant advance: Nanotechnology
- Awards: FReng

Ashwin Seshia is a scientist and engineer, known for his work in the fields of microelectromechanical systems (MEMS) and nanotechnology. He is currently the Professor of Microsystems Technology at the University of Cambridge.

== Early life and education ==
Seshia received his BTech degree in Engineering Physics from IIT Bombay in 1996. He then went to study in the United States until 2002, where he received his MS and PhD degrees in Electrical Engineering and Computer Science from the University of California, Berkeley.

== Career ==
Seshia has become known for his work in the field of microelectromechanical systems (MEMS) and sensor technology. He is currently a professor of Microsystems Technology at the University of Cambridge, where he leads the Micro and Nanoengineering Group within the Department of Engineering. Seshia's research focuses on the design, fabrication, and application of MEMS devices, which are tiny integrated devices or systems that combine electrical and mechanical components at a very small scale.

One of his notable areas of expertise is developing resonant MEMS devices, particularly resonant sensors and actuators. These devices use the mechanical vibrations of microstructures to sense various physical quantities such as acceleration, pressure, and temperature with high sensitivity and accuracy. His work in this field has led to him receiving numerous industry awards and recognition.

In 2014, he was awarded The Royal Academy of Engineering Silver Medal for his work in the field of nanotechnology. He is a Fellow of the Institute of Physics, the Institution for Engineering and Technology, and the Institute of Electrical and Electronics Engineers. In 1923, he was elected Fellow of the Royal Academy of Engineering.
