= Lucien LaCoste =

Lucien LaCoste (1908 – 1995) was a physicist and metrologist. He coinvented the modern gravimeter and invented the zero-length spring and vehicle-mounted gravimeters. He was also co-founder of LaCoste Romberg, a prominent company selling gravimetric instruments.

== Life ==
Simplified LaCoste suspension using a zero-length spring

LaCoste discovered the zero-length spring in 1932 while performing an assignment in Arnold Romberg's undergraduate physics course. A zero-length spring is a spring supported in such a way that its exerted force is proportional to its length, rather than the distance it is compressed. That is, over at least part of its travel, it does not conform to Hooke's law of spring compression.

The zero-length spring is extremely important to seismometers and gravimeters because it permits the design of vertical pendulums with (theoretically) infinite periods. In practice, periods of a thousand seconds are possible, a hundredfold increase from other forms of pendulum.

Over a short period starting in 1932, the design of these instruments was revolutionized, obsoleting all previous designs.

During this period, LaCoste and his physics teacher Arnold Romberg invented the first modern seismographs and gravimeters, using steel and quartz (respectively) zero-length springs.

While a graduate student, LaCoste decided to go into business together with Romberg, selling advanced gravimeters to oil-exploration companies.

LaCoste's most famous invention is the ship- and aircraft-mounted gravimeter. These revolutionized exploration for minerals by allowing wide-ranging geological surveys. The chief problem that Lacoste defeated was to distinguish the accelerations of the vehicles from the accelerations due to gravity, and measure the minute changes in gravity. Since the accelerations from the vehicle typically are hundreds to thousands of times more forceful than the measured changes, this invention was considered impossible until LaCoste demonstrated it.
