= Gal (unit) =

Centimeter–gram–second unit of acceleration

gal
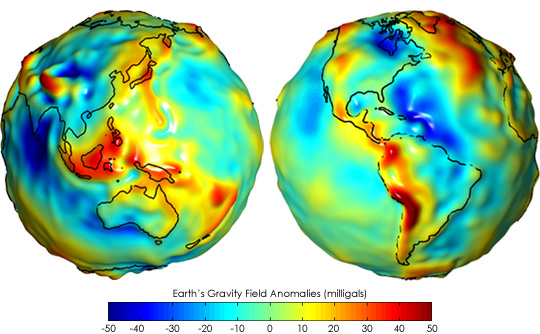
- Earth's gravity measured by NASA GRACE mission, showing deviations from the theoretical gravity of an idealized smooth Earth, the so-called earth ellipsoid. Red shows the areas where gravity is stronger than the smooth, standard value, and blue reveals areas where gravity is weaker. (Animated version.)

General information
- Unit system: CGS units
- Unit of: Acceleration
- Symbol: Gal
- Named after: Galileo Galilei

Conversions
1 Gal in ...	... is equal to ...
- CGS base units: 1 cm/s^{2}
- SI units: 0.01 m/s^{2}
- Imperial, US customary: 0.03280840 ft/s^{2}

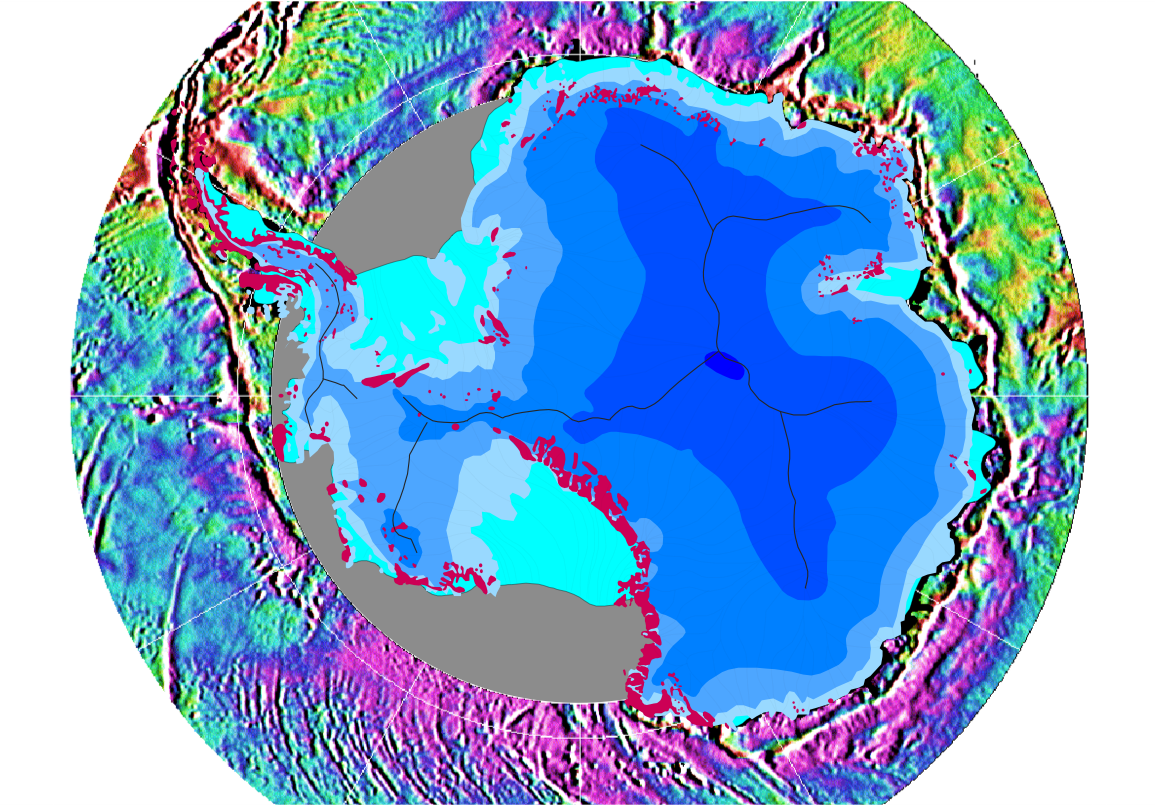
Gravity anomalies covering the Southern Ocean are shown here in false-color relief. Amplitudes range between −30 mGal (magenta) to +30 mGal (red). This image has been normalized to remove variation due to differences in latitude.

The gal (symbol: Gal), sometimes called galileo after Galileo Galilei, is a unit of acceleration typically used in precision gravimetry. The gal is defined as 1 centimeter per second squared (1 cm/s^{2}). The milligal (mGal) and microgal (μGal) are respectively one thousandth and one millionth of a gal.

The gal is not part of the International System of Units (known by its French-language initials "SI"). In 1978 the CIPM decided that it was permissible to use the gal "with the SI until the CIPM considers that [its] use is no longer necessary". Use of the gal was deprecated by the standard ISO 80000-3:2006, now superseded.

The gal is a derived unit, defined in terms of the centimeter–gram–second (CGS) base unit of length, the centimeter, and the second, which is the base unit of time in both the CGS and the modern SI system. In SI base units, 1 Gal is equal to 0.01 m/s^{2}.

The acceleration due to Earth's gravity at its surface is 976 to 983 Gal, the variation being due mainly to differences in latitude and elevation. Standard gravity is 980.665 Gal. Mountains and masses of lesser density within the Earth's crust typically cause variations in gravitational acceleration of 10 to hundreds of milligals (mGal).

The gravity gradient is usually expressed in eotvos (0.1 μGal/m). The vertical gravity gradient near Earth's surface is ~3.1 microgal per centimeter (3.1×10^{−6} s^{−2}), resulting in a maximal difference of about 2 Gal (0.02 m/s^{2}) from the top of Mount Everest to sea level.

Unless it is being used at the beginning of a sentence or in paragraph or section titles, the unit name gal is properly spelled with a lowercase g. As with the torr and its symbol, the unit name (gal) and its symbol (Gal) are spelled identically except that the latter is capitalized.

== Examples ==
Examples of Gal
Effect type	Effect size (Gal)
Various places on the surface of earth	976–983
Standard gravity	980.665
Surface gravity of moon	161–164
Change between Mount Everest's peak to sea level	~2
Precision of Kater's pendulum	7×10^{−3}
Magma entry under Mount Etna in 2002 October	4×10^{−4}
Semidiurnal and diurnal earth tide, due to sun and moon	3×10^{−4}
Pole tide component of earth tide, due to Chandler wobble	5×10^{−6}
Precision of a superconducting gravimeter	1×10^{−8}
Background level of the free oscillations of earth ("earth hum")	3×10^{−10}
Theoretical precision of an optomechanical gravimeter	1×10^{−13}

Many geophysical effects produce variation in surface gravity on the order of 0.1 to 1 μGal. These include change in ground water level by ~0.1 m, underground magma formations near a volcano, daily evapotranspiration from a deciduous forest, yearly change in ground height due to subsidence, the free oscillations of earth excited by major earthquakes, etc. For example, the maxima precision of a superconducting gravimeter is sufficient to measure groundwater level change of 1 mm, and can detect the onset of the 2011 Tohoku earthquake 510 km away from the epicenter.

By combining data from many measurements, the sensitivity of gravimetry can be decreased further. 100 days of measurement with a superconducting gravimeter reached 1×10^{−10} Gal in precision, which was sufficient to detect the hum of the earth.

== Conversions ==
Conversions between common units of acceleration
Base value	(Gal, or cm/s^{2})	(ft/s^{2})	(m/s^{2})	(standard gravity, g_{0})
1 Gal, or cm/s^{2}	1	0.0328084	0.01	1.01972×10^{−3}
1 ft/s^{2}	30.4800	1	0.304800	0.0310810
1 m/s^{2}	100	1/0.3048 ≈ 3.28084	1	0.101972
1 g_{0}	980.665	32.1740	9.80665	1

== See also ==
- Earth's gravity
- Eotvos (unit)
- g-force (g)
- Gravimetry
- Gravity
- Gravitational constant (G)
- Gravitational field
- Gravity gradiometry
