= Foot per second squared =

Unit of acceleration

foot per second squared
- Unit system: Imperial and US customary
- Unit of: acceleration
- Symbol: ft/s^{2}

Conversions
1 ft/s^{2} in ...	... is equal to ...
- m/s^{2}: 0.3048 m/s^{2}
- cm/s^{2} (Gal): 30.48 cm/s^{2}
- G-force: 0.03108 g

The foot per second squared (plural feet per second squared) is a unit of acceleration. It expresses change in velocity expressed in units of feet per second (ft/s) divided by time in seconds (s) (or the distance in feet (ft) traveled or displaced, divided by the time in seconds (s) squared). The corresponding unit in the International System of Units (SI) is the metre per second squared.

Abbreviations include ft/s^{2}, ft/sec^{2}, ft/s/s, ft/sec/sec, and ft s^{−2}.

== Conversions ==
Conversions between common units of acceleration
Base value	(Gal, or cm/s^{2})	(ft/s^{2})	(m/s^{2})	(standard gravity, g_{0})
1 Gal, or cm/s^{2}	1	0.0328084	0.01	1.01972×10^{−3}
1 ft/s^{2}	30.4800	1	0.304800	0.0310810
1 m/s^{2}	100	1/0.3048 ≈ 3.28084	1	0.101972
1 g_{0}	980.665	32.1740	9.80665	1

== See also ==
- Gal
- Gravitational acceleration
- Metre per second squared
- Standard gravity
