= Metre per second squared =

SI derived unit of acceleration

metre per second squared
- Unit system: SI
- Unit of: acceleration
- Symbol: m/s^{2}

The metre per second squared or metre per square second is the unit of acceleration in the International System of Units (SI). As a derived unit, it is composed from the SI base units of length, the metre, and of time, the second. Its symbol is written in several forms as m/s^{2}, m·s^{−2} or m s^{−2}, m/s^{2}, or less commonly, as (m/s)/s.

As acceleration, the unit is interpreted physically as change in velocity or speed per time interval, i.e. metre per second per second and is treated as a vector quantity.

== Example ==
When an object experiences a constant acceleration of one metre per second squared (1 m/s^{2}) from a state of rest, it achieves the speed of 5 m/s after 5 seconds and 10 m/s after 10 seconds. The average acceleration a can be calculated by dividing the speed v (m/s) by the time t (s), so the average acceleration in the first example would be calculated:

$$a = \frac{\Delta v}{\Delta t} = \frac{5\text{ m/s}}{5\text{ s}} = 1\text{ (m/s)/s} = 1\text{ m/s}^2$$.

== Related units ==
Newton's second law states that force equals mass multiplied by acceleration. The unit of force is the newton (N), and mass has the SI unit kilogram (kg). One newton equals one kilogram metre per second squared. Therefore, the unit metre per second squared is equivalent to newton per kilogram, N·kg^{−1}, or N/kg.

Thus, the Earth's gravitational field (near ground level) can be quoted as 9.8 metres per second squared, or the equivalent 9.8 N/kg.

Acceleration can be measured in ratios to gravity, such as g-force, and peak ground acceleration in earthquakes.

== Unicode character ==
The "metre per second squared" symbol is encoded by Unicode at code point U+33A8 ㎨ SQUARE M OVER S SQUARED. This is for compatibility with East Asian encodings and not intended to be used in new documents.

== Conversions ==
Conversions between common units of acceleration
Base value	(Gal, or cm/s^{2})	(ft/s^{2})	(m/s^{2})	(standard gravity, g_{0})
1 Gal, or cm/s^{2}	1	0.0328084	0.01	1.01972×10^{−3}
1 ft/s^{2}	30.4800	1	0.304800	0.0310810
1 m/s^{2}	100	1/0.3048 ≈ 3.28084	1	0.101972
1 g_{0}	980.665	32.1740	9.80665	1

== See also ==
- Foot per second squared
- Gal
- Gravitational acceleration
- Standard gravity
- Acceleration
