= Time dilation =

Measured time difference as explained by relativity theory

Time dilation is the difference in elapsed time as measured by two clocks, either because of a relative velocity, a consequence of special relativity, or a difference in gravitational potential between their locations due to gravitational time dilation. When unspecified, "time dilation" usually refers to the effect due to velocity. The dilation compares co-moving clock readings between events measured in different inertial frames and is not observed by visual comparison of clocks across moving frames.

These predictions of the theory of relativity have been repeatedly confirmed by experiment, and they are of practical concern, for instance in the operation of satellite navigation systems such as GPS and Galileo.

== Invisibility ==
Time dilation is a relationship between clock readings. Visually observed clock readings involve delays due to the propagation speed of light from the clock to the observer. Thus there is no direct way to observe time dilation. As an example of time dilation, two experimenters measuring a passing train traveling at .86 light speed may see a 2 second difference on their clocks, while on the train the engineer reports only one second elapsed when the experimenters went by. Observations of a clock on the front of the train would give completely different results. The light from the clock on the train when it is in front of the first experimenter would take 1.7s to reach the second experimenter and the train would pass by only 0.3s later. Thus the clock on the front of the train would appear to run faster as observed by the second experimenter. This effect of moving objects on observations is associated with the Doppler effect.

== History ==
Time dilation by the Lorentz factor was predicted by several authors at the turn of the 20th century. Joseph Larmor (1897) wrote that, at least for those orbiting a nucleus, individual electrons describe corresponding parts of their orbits in times shorter for the [rest] system in the ratio: $\sqrt{1 - \frac{v^2}{c^2}}.$ Emil Cohn (1904) specifically related this formula to the rate of clocks. In the context of special relativity it was shown by Albert Einstein (1905) that this effect concerns the nature of time itself, and he was also the first to point out its reciprocity or symmetry. Subsequently, Hermann Minkowski (1907) introduced the concept of proper time which further clarified the meaning of time dilation.

== Time dilation caused by a relative velocity ==
From the local frame of reference of the blue clock, the red clock, being in motion, is measured as ticking slower.

Special relativity indicates that, for an observer in an inertial frame of reference, a clock that is moving relative to the observer will be measured to tick more slowly than a clock at rest in the observer's frame of reference. This is sometimes called special relativistic time dilation. The faster the relative velocity, the greater the time dilation between them, with time slowing to a stop as one clock approaches the speed of light (299,792,458 m/s).

In theory, time dilation would make it possible for passengers in a fast-moving vehicle to advance into the future in a short period of their own time. With sufficiently high speeds, the effect would be dramatic. For example, one year of travel might correspond to ten years on Earth. Indeed, a constant 1 g acceleration would permit humans to travel through the entire known Universe in one human lifetime.

With current technology severely limiting the velocity of space travel, the differences experienced in practice are minuscule. After 6 months on the International Space Station (ISS), orbiting Earth at a speed of about 7,700 m/s, an astronaut will age about 5 milliseconds less than a person on Earth. The cosmonauts Sergei Krikalev and Sergey Avdeev both experienced time dilation of about 20 milliseconds compared to time that passed on Earth.

=== Simple inference ===
Time dilation can be inferred from the observed constancy of the speed of light in all reference frames dictated by the second postulate of special relativity. This constancy of the speed of light means that, counter to intuition, the speeds of material objects and light are not additive. It is not possible to make the speed of light appear greater by moving towards or away from the light source.

Light Clock Left: Observer at rest measures time 2L/c between co-local events of light signal generation at A and arrival at A. Right: Events according to an observer watching as the mirror setup moves to the right: bottom mirror A when signal is generated at time t'=0, top mirror B when signal gets reflected at time t'=D/c, bottom mirror A when signal returns at time t'=2D/c. Since $D > L$, the ticks of the moving clock are longer.

The relativity of time can be illustrated with a thought experiment based on an abstract vertical clock consisting of two mirrors A and B, between which a light pulse is bouncing. The separation of the mirrors is L and the clock ticks once each time the light pulse hits mirror A. In the frame in which the clock is at rest (see left part of the diagram), the light pulse traces out a path of length 2L and the time period between the ticks of the clock $\Delta t$ is equal to 2L divided by the speed of light c:

$$\Delta t = \frac{2 L}{c}.$$

If the clock now moves with speed v relative to the observer (right part of diagram), the light pulse is seen as tracing out a longer, angled path 2D. Keeping the speed of light constant in the observer's frame and the clock's frame requires a lengthening (that is dilation) of the time period between the ticks of this clock $\Delta t'$ from the observer's perspective. This moving clock will be running (that is ticking) more slowly, since tick rate equals one over the time period between ticks 1/$\Delta t'.$

The total time for the light pulse to trace its path is given by

$$\Delta t' = \frac{2 D}{c}.$$

By the Pythagorean theorem, the length of the half path is

$$D = \sqrt{\left (\frac{1}{2}v \Delta t'\right )^2 + L^2}.$$

Eliminating the variables D and L from these three equations gives

Time dilation equation

$\Delta t' = \frac{\Delta t}{\sqrt{1 - \frac{v^2}{c^2}}} = {\gamma}{\Delta t}.$

This equation shows that the period of the moving clock $\Delta t'$ is longer than the period $\Delta t$ in the stationary clock. The Lorentz factor gamma (γ) is defined as

$$\gamma = \frac{1}{\sqrt{1 - \frac{v^2}{c^2}}}.$$

Because all clocks that have a common period in the resting frame should have a common period when observed from the moving frame, all other clocks—mechanical, electronic, optical (such as an identical horizontal version of the clock in the example)—should exhibit the same velocity-dependent time dilation.

=== Reciprocity ===
Transversal time dilation. The blue dots represent a pulse of light. Each pair of dots with light "bouncing" between them is a clock. In the frame of each group of clocks, the other group is measured to tick more slowly, because the moving clock's light pulse has to travel a larger distance than the stationary clock's light pulse. That is so, even though the clocks are identical and their relative motion is perfectly reciprocal.

Given a certain frame of reference, and the "stationary" observer described earlier, if a second observer accompanied the "moving" clock, each of the observers would measure the other's clock as ticking at a slower rate than their own local clock, due to them both measuring the other to be the one that is in motion relative to their own stationary frame of reference.

Common sense would dictate that, if the passage of time has slowed for a moving object, said object would observe the external world's time to be correspondingly sped up. Counterintuitively, special relativity predicts the opposite. When two observers are in motion relative to each other, each will measure the other's clock slowing down, in concordance with them being in motion relative to the observer's frame of reference.

Time UV of a clock in S is shorter compared to Ux′ in S′, and time UW of a clock in S′ is shorter compared to Ux in S.

While this seems self-contradictory, a similar oddity occurs in everyday life. If two persons A and B observe each other from a distance, B will appear small to A, but at the same time, A will appear small to B. Being familiar with the effects of perspective, there is no contradiction or paradox in this situation.

The reciprocity of the phenomenon also leads to the so-called twin paradox where the aging of twins, one staying on Earth and the other embarking on space travel, is compared, and where the reciprocity suggests that both persons should have the same age when they reunite. On the contrary, at the end of the round-trip, the traveling twin will be younger than the sibling on Earth. The dilemma posed by the paradox can be explained by the fact that the situation is not symmetric. The twin staying on Earth is in a single inertial frame, and the traveling twin is in two different inertial frames: one on the way out and another on the way back. See also Twin paradox § Role of acceleration.

=== Experimental testing ===
==== Moving particles ====
- A comparison of muon lifetimes at different speeds is possible. In the laboratory, slow muons are produced; and in the atmosphere, very fast-moving muons are introduced by cosmic rays. Taking the muon lifetime at rest as the laboratory value of 2.197 μs, the lifetime of a cosmic-ray-produced muon traveling at 98% of the speed of light is about five times longer, in agreement with observations. An example is Rossi and Hall (1941), who compared the population of cosmic-ray-produced muons at the top of a mountain to that observed at sea level.
- The lifetimes of particles produced in particle accelerators are longer due to time dilation. In such experiments, the "clock" is the time taken by processes leading to muon decay, and these processes take place in the moving muon at its own "clock rate", which is much slower than the laboratory clock. This is routinely taken into account in particle physics, and many dedicated measurements have been performed. For instance, in the muon storage ring at CERN the lifetime of muons circulating with γ = 29.327 was found to be dilated to 64.378 μs, confirming time dilation to an accuracy of 0.9 ± 0.4 parts per thousand.

==== Doppler effect ====
- The stated purpose by Ives and Stilwell (1938, 1941) of these experiments was to verify the time dilation effect, predicted by Larmor–Lorentz ether theory, due to motion through the ether using Einstein's suggestion that Doppler effect in canal rays would provide a suitable experiment. These experiments measured the Doppler shift of the radiation emitted from canal rays, when viewed from directly in front and from directly behind. The high and low frequencies detected were not the classically predicted values
  $$\frac{f_0}{1 - v/c} \qquad \text{and} \qquad \frac{f_0}{1+v/c}.$$
  The high and low frequencies of the radiation from the moving sources were measured as
  $$\sqrt{ \frac{1 + v/c}{1 - v/c} } f_0 = \gamma \left(1 + v/c\right) f_0 \qquad \text{and} \qquad \sqrt{ \frac{1 - v/c}{1 + v/c} } f_0 = \gamma \left(1 - v/c\right) f_0,$$
  as deduced by Einstein (1905) from the Lorentz transformation, when the source is running slow by the Lorentz factor.
- Hasselkamp, Mondry, and Scharmann (1979) measured the Doppler shift from a source moving at right angles to the line of sight. The relativistic Doppler relation, derived by Einstein (1905), can be written as
  $$f_\mathrm{detected} = \frac{f_\mathrm{rest}}{\gamma\left(1 - \frac{v}{c}\cos\phi\right)},$$
  where $v$ is the source's speed and $\phi$ is the angle between its velocity and the direction of light propagation toward the observer, measured in the observer's frame. For ϕ = 90° (cos ϕ = 0) this reduces to f_{detected} = f_{rest}/γ. This lower frequency from the moving source can be attributed to the time dilation effect and is often called the transverse Doppler effect and was predicted by relativity.
- In 2010 time dilation was observed at speeds of less than 10 metres per second using optical atomic clocks connected by 75 metres of optical fiber.

=== Proper time and Minkowski diagram ===
Minkowski diagram and twin paradox

Clock C in relative motion between two synchronized clocks A and B. C meets A at d, and B at f.

Twin paradox. One twin has to change frames, leading to different proper times in the twin's world lines.

In the Minkowski diagram from the first image on the right, clock C resting in inertial frame S′ meets clock A at d and clock B at f (both resting in S). All three clocks simultaneously start to tick in S. The worldline of A is the ct-axis, the worldline of B intersecting f is parallel to the ct-axis, and the worldline of C is the ct′-axis. All events simultaneous with d in S are on the x-axis, in S′ on the x′-axis.

The proper time between two events is indicated by a clock present at both events. It is invariant, i.e., in all inertial frames it is agreed that this time is indicated by that clock. Interval df is, therefore, the proper time of clock C, and is shorter with respect to the coordinate times ef=dg of clocks B and A in S. Conversely, also proper time ef of B is shorter with respect to time if in S′, because event e was measured in S′ already at time i due to relativity of simultaneity, long before C started to tick.

From that it can be seen, that the proper time between two events indicated by an unaccelerated clock present at both events, compared with the synchronized coordinate time measured in all other inertial frames, is always the minimal time interval between those events. However, the interval between two events can also correspond to the proper time of accelerated clocks present at both events. Under all possible proper times between two events, the proper time of the unaccelerated clock is maximal, which is the solution to the twin paradox.

=== Derivation and formulation ===
Lorentz factor as a function of speed (in natural units where c = 1). Notice that for small speeds (as v tends to zero), γ is approximately 1.

In addition to the light clock used above, the formula for time dilation can be more generally derived from the temporal part of the Lorentz transformation. Let there be two events at which the clock indicates $t_{a}$ and $t_{b}.$ The corresponding times in the other inertial frame are

$$t_{a}^{\prime}=\frac{t_{a}-\frac{vx_{a}}{c^{2}}}{\sqrt{1-\frac{v^{2}}{c^{2}}}},\ t_{b}^{\prime}=\frac{t_{b}-\frac{vx_{b}}{c^{2}}}{\sqrt{1-\frac{v^{2}}{c^{2}}}}.$$

Since the clock remains at rest in its inertial frame, $x_{a}=x_{b}.$ The interval $\Delta t^{\prime}=t_{b}^{\prime}-t_{a}^{\prime}$ is given by

$$\Delta t' = \gamma \, \Delta t = \frac{\Delta t}{\sqrt{1-\frac{v^2}{c^2}}},$$

where Δt, known as the proper time, is the time interval between two co-local events (i.e. happening at the same place) for an observer in some inertial frame (e.g. ticks on their clock), Δt′ is the time interval between those same events, as measured by another observer, inertially moving with velocity v with respect to the former observer, v is the relative velocity between the observer and the moving clock, c is the speed of light, and the Lorentz factor (conventionally denoted by the Greek letter gamma or γ) is

$$\gamma = \frac{1}{\sqrt{1-\frac{v^2}{c^2}}}.$$

Thus the duration of the clock cycle of a moving clock is found to be increased: it is measured to be "running slow". The range of such variances in ordinary life, where v ≪ c, even considering space travel, are not great enough to produce easily detectable time dilation effects and such vanishingly small effects can be safely ignored for most purposes. As an approximate threshold, time dilation of 0.5% may become important when an object approaches speeds on the order of 30,000 km/s (1/10 the speed of light).

=== Hyperbolic motion ===
In special relativity, time dilation is most simply described in circumstances where relative velocity is unchanging. Nevertheless, the Lorentz equations allow one to calculate proper time and movement in space for the simple case of a spaceship which is applied with a force per unit mass, relative to some reference object in uniform (i.e. constant velocity) motion, equal to g throughout the period of measurement.

Let t be the time in an inertial frame subsequently called the rest frame. Let x be a spatial coordinate, and let the direction of the constant acceleration as well as the spaceship's velocity (relative to the rest frame) be parallel to the x-axis. Assume that at time t = 0, the spaceship is at x = 0 and has velocity v_{0}. Define

$$\gamma_0 = \frac{1}{\sqrt{1-v_0^2/c^2}}.$$

The following formulas hold:

The ship's position is

$$x(t) = \frac {c^2}{g} \left( \sqrt{1 + \frac{\left(gt + v_0\gamma_0\right)^2}{c^2}} -\gamma_0 \right).$$

The ship's velocity is

$$v(t) =\frac{gt + v_0\gamma_0}{\sqrt{1 + \frac{ \left(gt + v_0\gamma_0\right)^2}{c^2}}}.$$

The proper time as a function of coordinate time is

$$\tau(t) = \tau_0 + \int_0^t \sqrt{ 1 - \left( \frac{v(t')}{c} \right)^2 } dt'.$$

In the case where v(0) = v_{0} = 0 and τ(0) = τ_{0} = 0 the integral can be expressed as a logarithmic function or, equivalently, as an inverse hyperbolic function

$$\tau(t) = \frac{c}{g} \ln \left( \frac{gt}{c} + \sqrt{ 1 + \left( \frac{gt}{c} \right)^2 } \right) = \frac{c}{g} \operatorname {arsinh} \left( \frac{gt}{c} \right).$$

As functions of the proper time $\tau$ of the ship, the following formulae hold:

The ship's position is

$$x(\tau) = \frac{c^2}{g} \left( \cosh \frac{g \tau}{c}-1 \right).$$

The ship's velocity is

$$v(\tau) = c \tanh \frac{g \tau}{c}.$$

The coordinate time as a function of proper time is

$$t(\tau) = \frac{c}{g} \sinh \frac{g \tau}{c}.$$

=== Clock hypothesis ===
The clock hypothesis is the assumption that the rate at which a clock is affected by time dilation does not depend on its acceleration but only on its instantaneous velocity. This is equivalent to stating that a clock moving along a path $P$ measures the proper time, defined by

$$\tau = \int_P \sqrt {dt^2 - dx^2/c^2 - dy^2/c^2 - dz^2/c^2}.$$

The clock hypothesis was implicitly (but not explicitly) included in Einstein's original 1905 formulation of special relativity. Since then, it has become a standard assumption and is usually included in the axioms of special relativity, especially in light of experimental verification up to very high accelerations in particle accelerators.

== Time dilation caused by gravity or acceleration ==
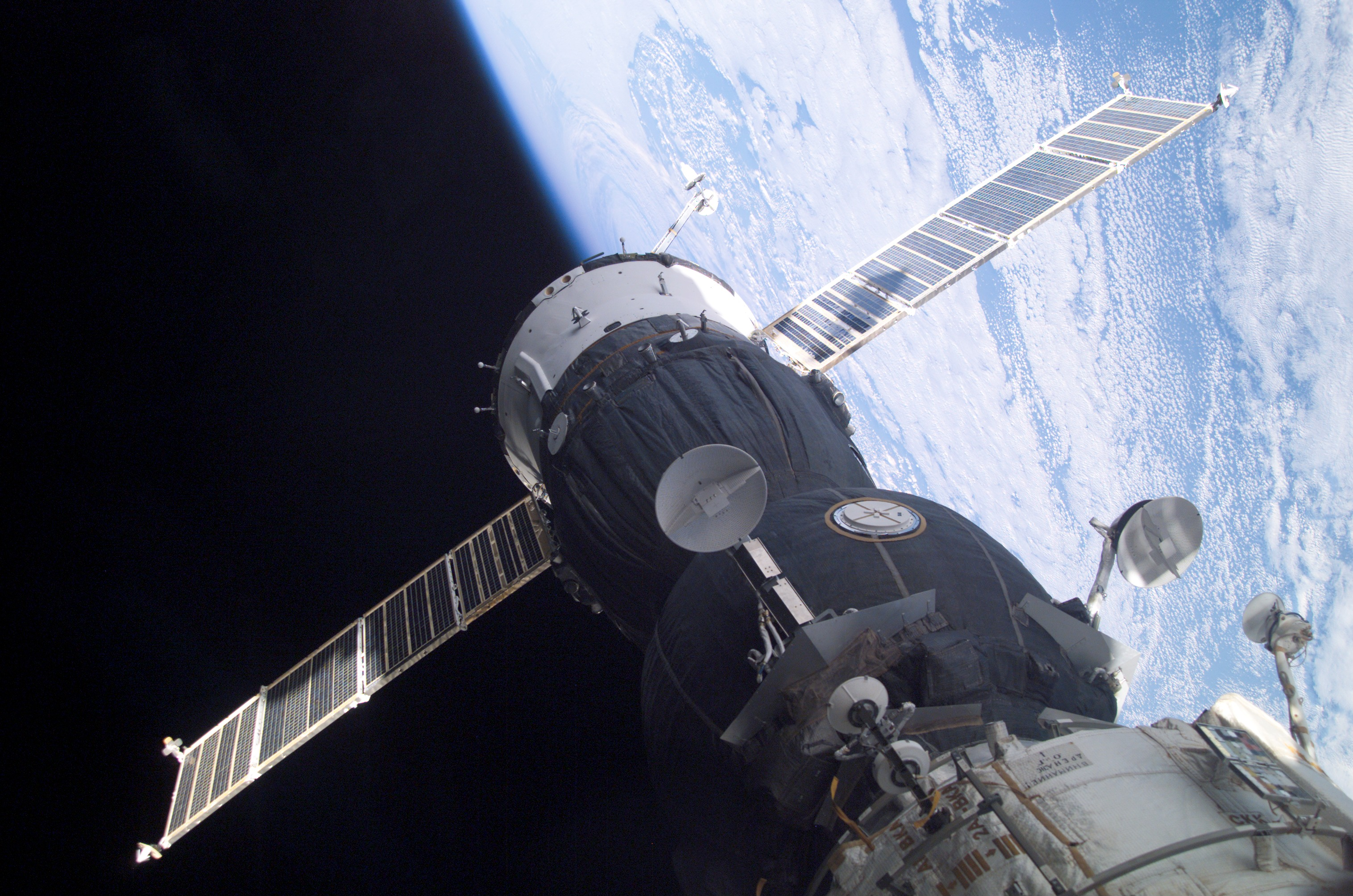
Time dilation explains why two working clocks will report different times after different accelerations. For example, time goes slower at the ISS, lagging approximately 0.01 seconds for every 12 Earth months passed. For GPS satellites to work, they must adjust for similar bending of spacetime to coordinate properly with systems on Earth.

Gravitational time dilation is experienced by an observer that, at a certain altitude within a gravitational potential well, finds that their local clocks measure less elapsed time than identical clocks situated at higher altitude (and which are therefore at higher gravitational potential). Unlike velocity time dilation, in which both observers measure the other as aging slower (a reciprocal effect), gravitational time dilation is not reciprocal. This means that with gravitational time dilation both observers agree that the clock nearer the center of the gravitational field is slower in rate, and they agree on the ratio of the difference.

Gravitational time dilation is at play e.g. for ISS astronauts. While the astronauts' relative velocity slows down their time, the reduced gravitational influence at their location speeds it up, although to a lesser degree. Also, a climber's time is theoretically passing slightly faster at the top of a mountain compared to people at sea level.

"A clock used to time a full rotation of the Earth will measure the day to be approximately an extra 10 ns/day longer for every km of altitude above the reference geoid." Travel to regions of space where extreme gravitational time dilation is taking place, such as near (but not beyond the event horizon of) a black hole, could yield time-shifting results analogous to those of near-lightspeed space travel.

Richard Feynman suggested in a lecture that, due to time dilation, the core of the Earth is younger than the crust. Subsequent calculations suggest the core is 2.5 years younger, out of 4.5 billion years.

=== Experimental testing ===
- In 1959, Robert Pound and Glen Rebka measured the very slight gravitational redshift in the frequency of light emitted at a lower height, where Earth's gravitational field is relatively more intense. The results were within 10% of the predictions of general relativity. In 1964, Pound and J. L. Snider measured a result within 1% of the value predicted by gravitational time dilation. (See Pound–Rebka experiment)
- In 2010, gravitational time dilation was measured at the Earth's surface with a height difference of only 33 centimeters, using optical atomic clocks.

== Combined effect of velocity and gravitational time dilation ==
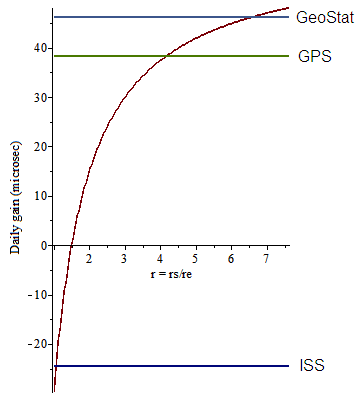
Daily time dilation (gain or loss if negative) in microseconds as a function of (circular) orbit radius r = rs/re, where rs is satellite orbit radius and re is the equatorial Earth radius, calculated using the Schwarzschild metric. At r ≈ 1.497 (Note: Average time dilation has a weak dependence on the orbital inclination angle (Ashby 2003, p.32). The r ≈ 1.497 result corresponds to the orbital inclination of modern GPS satellites, which is 55 degrees.) there is no time dilation. Here the effects of motion and reduced gravity cancel. ISS astronauts fly below, whereas GPS and geostationary satellites fly above.

High-accuracy timekeeping, low-Earth-orbit satellite tracking, and pulsar timing are applications that require the consideration of the combined effects of mass and motion in producing time dilation. Practical examples include the International Atomic Time standard and its relationship with the Barycentric Coordinate Time standard used for interplanetary objects.

Relativistic time dilation effects for the Solar System and the Earth can be modeled very precisely by the Schwarzschild solution to the Einstein field equations. In the Schwarzschild metric, the interval $dt_\text{E}$ is given by

$$dt_\text{E}^2 = \left( 1-\frac{2GM_\text{i}}{r_\text{i} c^2} \right) dt_\text{c}^2 - \left( 1-\frac{2GM_\text{i}}{r_\text{i} c^2} \right)^{-1} \frac{dx^2+dy^2+dz^2}{c^2},$$

where

- $dt_\text{E}$ is a small increment of proper time $t_\text{E}$ (an interval that could be recorded on an atomic clock),
- $dt_\text{c}$ is a small increment in the coordinate $t_\text{c}$ (coordinate time),
- $dx, dy, dz$ are small increments in the three coordinates $x, y, z$ of the clock's position,
- $\frac{-G M_i}{r_i}$ represents the sum of the Newtonian gravitational potentials due to the masses in the neighborhood, based on their distances $r_i$ from the clock. This sum includes any tidal potentials.

The coordinate velocity of the clock is given by

$$v^2 = \frac{dx^2+dy^2+dz^2}{dt_\text{c}^2}.$$

The coordinate time $t_\text{c}$ is the time that would be read on a hypothetical "coordinate clock" situated infinitely far from all gravitational masses ($U=0$), and stationary in the system of coordinates ($v=0$). The exact relation between the rate of proper time and the rate of coordinate time for a clock with a radial component of velocity is

$$\frac{dt_\text{E}}{dt_\text{c}}
= \sqrt{ 1 + \frac{2U}{c^2} - \frac{v^2}{c^2} + \left( \frac{c^2}{2U} + 1 \right)^{-1} \frac{{v_\shortparallel}^2}{c^2} }
= \sqrt{ 1 - \left( \beta^2 + \beta_e^2 + \frac{\beta_\shortparallel^2 \beta_e^2}{1 - \beta_e^2} \right) },$$

where

- $v_\shortparallel$ is the radial velocity,
- $v_e = \sqrt{ \frac{2 G M_i}{r_i} }$ is the escape speed,
- $\beta = v/c,$ $\beta_e = v_e/c$ and $\beta_\shortparallel = v_\shortparallel/c$ are velocities as a percentage of speed of light c,
- $U = \frac{-G M_i}{r_i}$ is the Newtonian potential; hence $-U$ equals half the square of the escape speed.

The above equation is exact under the assumptions of the Schwarzschild solution. It reduces to velocity time dilation equation in the presence of motion and absence of gravity, i.e. $\beta_e = 0.$ It reduces to gravitational time dilation equation in the absence of motion and presence of gravity, i.e. $\beta = 0 = \beta_\shortparallel.$

=== Experimental testing ===
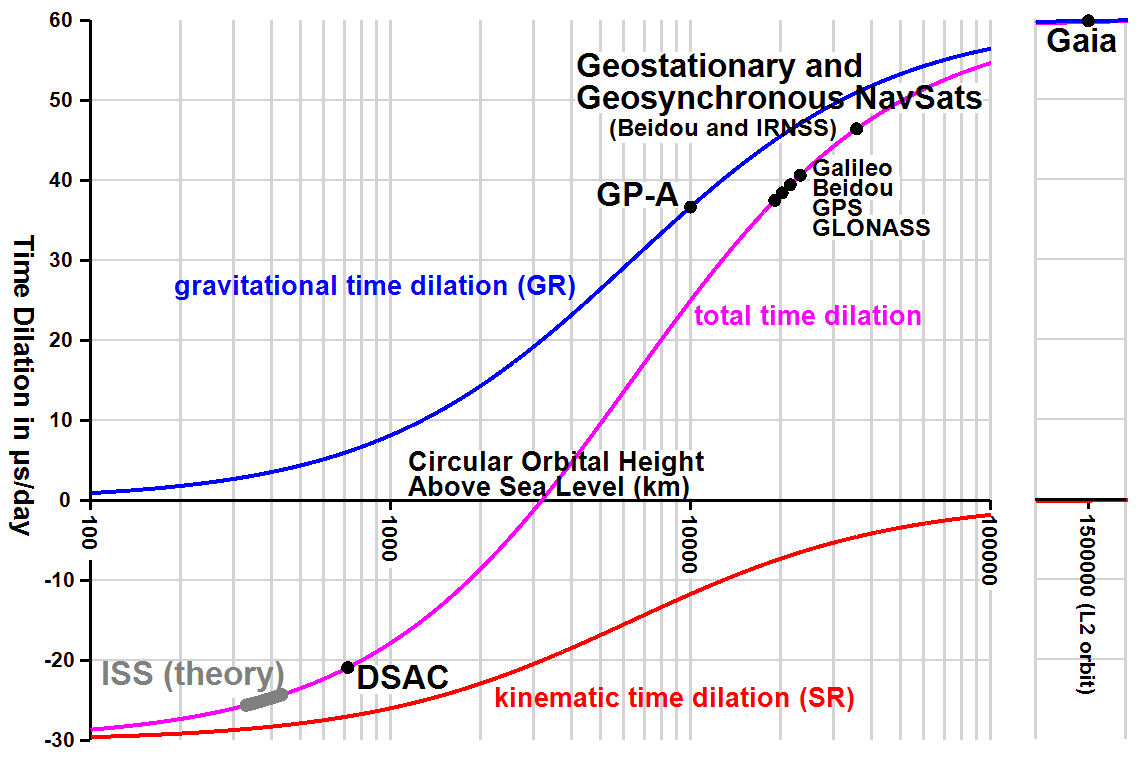
Daily time dilation over circular orbit height split into its components. On this chart, only Gravity Probe A was launched specifically to test general relativity. The other spacecraft on this chart (except for the ISS, whose range of points is marked "theory") carry atomic clocks whose proper operation depends on the validity of general relativity.

- Hafele and Keating, in 1971, flew caesium atomic clocks east and west around the Earth in commercial airliners, to compare the elapsed time against that of a clock that remained at the U.S. Naval Observatory. Two opposite effects came into play. The clocks were expected to age more quickly (show a larger elapsed time) than the reference clock since they were in a higher (weaker) gravitational potential for most of the trip (cf. Pound–Rebka experiment). But also, contrastingly, the moving clocks were expected to age more slowly because of the speed of their travel. From the actual flight paths of each trip, the theory predicted that the flying clocks, compared with reference clocks at the U.S. Naval Observatory, should have lost 40±23 nanoseconds during the eastward trip and should have gained 275±21 nanoseconds during the westward trip. Relative to the atomic time scale of the U.S. Naval Observatory, the flying clocks lost 59±10 nanoseconds during the eastward trip and gained 273±7 nanoseconds during the westward trip (where the error bars represent standard deviation). In 2005, the National Physical Laboratory in the United Kingdom reported their limited replication of this experiment. The NPL experiment differed from the original in that the caesium clocks were sent on a shorter trip (London–Washington, D.C. return), but the clocks were more accurate. The reported results are within 4% of the predictions of relativity, within the uncertainty of the measurements.
- The Global Positioning System can be considered a continuously operating experiment in both special and general relativity. The in-orbit clocks are corrected for both special and general relativistic time dilation effects as described above, so that (as observed from the Earth's surface) they run at the same rate as clocks on the surface of the Earth.

== In popular culture ==
=== Popular misconception ===
The unexpected nature of time dilation makes it a common subject of misconception. One form of misconception claims that time dilation applies only to light-based clocks, such as the light clock used in many textbook derivations of the Lorentz transformation, and not to mechanical, atomic, or biological timekeeping devices. This misunderstanding can lead to incorrect conclusions about experimental results, such as the Hafele–Keating experiment, which involved atomic clocks flown around the Earth.

To address this, a thought experiment known as Einstein's Cat was proposed by physicist Val G. Rousseau. The scenario involves a fictional device—the Sync-or-Die clock—that compares the synchronization of a light clock and a mechanical stopwatch. The life of a cat depends on the precise timing between these two clocks when analyzed in different inertial frames. The paradox arises when time dilation is assumed to apply only to the light pulse but not the mechanical clock. Under this incorrect assumption, the cat would be expected to die only by observers moving relative to the cat. The apparent contradiction is resolved when both clocks are recognized as equally subject to relativistic time dilation. This illustrates the fundamental principle that time dilation is a universal feature of special relativity, independent of the clock's internal mechanism.

== In fiction ==
Velocity and gravitational time dilation have been the subject of science fiction works in a variety of media. Some examples in film are the movies Interstellar and Planet of the Apes. In Interstellar, a key plot point involves a planet, which is close to a rotating black hole and on the surface of which one hour is equivalent to seven years on Earth due to time dilation. Physicist Kip Thorne collaborated in making the film and explained its scientific concepts in the book The Science of Interstellar.

The Queen song "'39" was written by astrophysicist as well as musician Brian May, and is centred around the time dilation effect on spacefarers searching for a new home for mankind, as we gradually ruin planet Earth. They return successful, only to find that all and everything they knew has long since passed away.

In part two of the Steven Wilson song "The Overview" the vocals are from the point of a view of a space traveler who states that "back on Earth, my loving wife's been dead for years" and "each moment for me is a lifetime for you."

Time dilation was used in the Doctor Who episodes "World Enough and Time" and "The Doctor Falls", which take place on a spaceship in the vicinity of a black hole. Due to the immense gravitational pull of the black hole and the ship's length (400 miles), time moves faster at one end than the other. When The Doctor's companion, Bill, gets taken away to the other end of the ship, she waits years for him to rescue her; in his time, only minutes pass. Furthermore, the dilation allows the Cybermen to evolve at a "faster" rate than previously seen in the show.

Tau Zero, a novel by Poul Anderson, is an early example of the concept in science fiction literature. In the novel, a spacecraft uses a Bussard ramjet to accelerate to high enough speeds that the crew spends five years on board, but thirty-three years pass on the Earth before they arrive at their destination. The velocity time dilation is explained by Anderson in terms of the tau factor which decreases closer and closer to zero as the ship approaches the speed of light—hence the title of the novel. Due to an accident, the crew is unable to stop accelerating the spacecraft, causing such extreme time dilation that the crew experiences the Big Crunch at the end of the universe. Other examples in literature, such as Rocannon's World, Hyperion and The Forever War, similarly make use of relativistic time dilation as a scientifically plausible literary device to have certain characters age slower than the rest of the universe.

== See also ==
- Length contraction
- Mass in special relativity
