= Clock-comparison experiment =

Clock-comparison experiments are tests of the theory of relativity and may refer to:

- Hafele–Keating experiment, comparing the drift in cesium beam atomic clocks on airplanes.
- Hughes–Drever experiment, comparing energy levels of nucleons or electrons
- Optical cavity tests, comparing laser frequencies
- Pound–Rebka experiment, comparing clock rates to test gravitational redshift
- Gravity Probe A, comparing clock rates to test gravitational redshift
