= Rudolf Mössbauer =

German physicist (1929–2011)

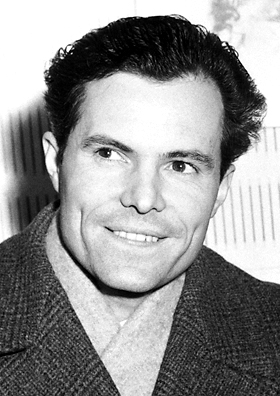
- Mössbauer in 1961
- Born: Rudolf Ludwig Mössbauer; 31 January 1929; Munich, Bavaria, Weimar Republic
- Died: 14 September 2011 (aged 82); Grünwald, Bavaria, Germany
- Education: Technical University of Munich (PhD, 1958)
- Known for: Discovering the Mössbauer effect (1958); Lamb–Mössbauer factor (1959)
- Spouses: Elizabeth Pritz (m. 1957; div. 1983) Christel Braun (m. 1985)
- Awards: Elliott Cresson Medal (1961); Nobel Prize in Physics (1961); Guthrie Medal and Prize (1974); Lomonosov Gold Medal (1984); Albert Einstein Medal (1986)
- Honors: Pour le Mérite (1996)
- Scientific career
- Fields: Physics; Nuclear physics
- Workplaces: Technical University of Munich (1958–1960); California Institute of Technology (1960–1997)
- Doctoral advisor: Heinz Maier-Leibnitz

Rudolf Ludwig Mössbauer (German: [ˈʁuːdɔlf ˈmœsˌbaʊ̯ɐ]; 31 January 1929 – 14 September 2011) was a German physicist who shared the 1961 Nobel Prize in Physics with Robert Hofstadter for his discovery of the Mössbauer effect, which is the basis for Mössbauer spectroscopy.

== Career ==
Mössbauer was born in Munich, where he also studied physics at the Technical University of Munich. He prepared his Diplom thesis in the Laboratory of Applied Physics of Heinz Maier-Leibnitz and graduated in 1955. He then went to the Max Planck Institute for Medical Research in Heidelberg. Since this institute, not part of a university, had no right to award a doctorate, Mössbauer remained under the auspices of Maier-Leibnitz, his official thesis advisor, when he passed his PhD exam in Munich in 1958.

In his PhD, he discovered the recoilless nuclear fluorescence of gamma rays in 191 iridium, the Mössbauer effect. His fame grew immensely in 1960 when Robert Pound and Glen Rebka used this effect to prove the red shift of gamma radiation in the gravitational field of the Earth; this Pound–Rebka experiment was one of the first experimental precision tests of Albert Einstein's general theory of relativity. However, the long-term importance of the Mössbauer effect is its use in Mössbauer spectroscopy. Along with Robert Hofstadter, Rudolf Mössbauer was awarded the 1961 Nobel Prize in Physics.

On the suggestion of Richard Feynman, Mössbauer was invited in 1960 to Caltech in the USA, where he advanced rapidly from research fellow to senior research fellow; he was appointed a full professor of physics in early 1962. In 1964, his alma mater, the Technical University of Munich (TUM), convinced him to go back as a full professor. He retained this position until he became professor emeritus in 1997. As a condition for his return, the faculty of physics introduced a "department" system. This system, strongly influenced by Mössbauer's American experience, was in radical contrast to the traditional, hierarchical "faculty" system of German universities, and it gave the TUM an eminent position in German physics.

In 1972, Rudolf Mössbauer went to Grenoble to succeed Heinz Maier-Leibnitz as the director of the Institut Laue-Langevin just when its newly built high-flux research reactor went into operation. After serving a five-year term, Mössbauer returned to Munich, where he found his institutional reforms reversed by overarching legislation. Until the end of his career, he often expressed bitterness over this "destruction of the department." Meanwhile, his research interests shifted to neutrino physics.

Mössbauer was regarded as an excellent teacher. He gave highly specialized lectures on numerous courses, including Neutrino Physics, Neutrino Oscillations, The Unification of the Electromagnetic and Weak Interactions and The Interaction of Photons and Neutrons With Matter. In 1984, he gave undergraduate lectures to 350 people taking the physics course. He told his students: “Explain it! The most important thing is that you can explain it! You will have exams, there you have to explain it. Eventually, you pass them, you get your diploma and you think, that's it! – No, the whole life is an exam, you'll have to write applications, you'll have to discuss with peers... So learn to explain it! You can train this by explaining to another student, a colleague. If they are not available, explain it to your mother – or to your cat!”

== Personal life ==
Mössbauer married Elizabeth Pritz in 1957. They had a son, Peter and two daughters Regine and Susi. They divorced in 1983, and he married his second wife Christel Braun in 1985.

Mössbauer died at Grünwald, Germany on 14 September 2011 at 82.
