= Mössbauer (disambiguation) =

Rudolf Mössbauer (1929–2011) was a German physicist.

Mössbauer may also refer to:

- Mössbauer effect, or recoilless nuclear resonance fluorescence
- Mössbauer spectroscopy, a spectroscopic technique based on the Mössbauer effect
