= Equivalence principle =

Hypothesis that inertial and gravitational masses are equivalent

A falling object behaves exactly the same on a planet or in an equivalent accelerating frame of reference.

The equivalence principle is the hypothesis that the observed equivalence of gravitational and inertial mass is a consequence of nature. The weak form, known for centuries, relates to masses of any composition in free fall taking the same trajectories and landing at identical times. The extended form by Albert Einstein requires special relativity to also hold in free fall and requires the weak equivalence to be valid everywhere. This form was a critical input for the development of the theory of general relativity. The strong form requires Einstein's form to work for stellar objects. Highly precise experimental tests of the principle limit possible deviations from equivalence to be very small.

== Concept ==
In classical mechanics, Newton's equation of motion in a gravitational field, written out in full, is:

inertial mass × acceleration = gravitational mass × gravitational acceleration

Careful experiments have shown that the inertial mass on the left side and gravitational mass on the right side are numerically equal and independent of the material composing the masses. The equivalence principle is the hypothesis that this numerical equality of inertial and gravitational mass is a consequence of their fundamental identity. The equivalence principle can be considered an extension of the principle of relativity, the principle that the laws of physics are invariant under uniform motion.

An observer in a windowless room cannot distinguish between being in a uniform gravitational field of 1g and being in a spaceship in deep space accelerating at 1g. Observations of physical phenomena in these cases will be indistinguishable.

In Newton's law of gravity, the equivalence principle is viewed as an observation, an accident of nature encoded in empirical law. In Einstein's model of gravity, the equivalence principle is a consequence of physics. The same mass both causes and responds to gravity: mass causes spacetime curvature and then moves through spacetime according to that curvature.

== History ==
By experimenting with the acceleration of different materials, Galileo Galilei determined that gravitation is independent of the amount of mass being accelerated.

Isaac Newton, just 50 years after Galileo, investigated whether gravitational and inertial mass might be different concepts. He compared the periods of pendulums composed of different materials and found them to be identical. From this, he inferred that gravitational and inertial mass are the same thing. The form of this assertion, where the equivalence principle is taken to follow from empirical consistency, later became known as "weak equivalence".

A version of the equivalence principle consistent with special relativity was introduced by Albert Einstein in 1907, when he observed that identical physical laws are observed in two systems, one subject to a constant gravitational field causing acceleration and the other subject to constant acceleration, like a rocket far from any gravitational field. Since the physical laws are the same, Einstein assumed the gravitational field and the acceleration were "physically equivalent". Einstein stated this hypothesis by saying he would:

...assume the complete physical equivalence of a gravitational field and a corresponding acceleration of the reference system.

— Einstein, 1907

In 1911 Einstein demonstrated the power of the equivalence principle by using it to predict that clocks run at different rates in a gravitational potential, and light rays bend in a gravitational field. He connected the equivalence principle to his earlier principle of special relativity:

This assumption of exact physical equivalence makes it impossible for us to speak of the absolute acceleration of the system of reference, just as the usual theory of relativity forbids us to talk of the absolute velocity of a system; and it makes the equal falling of all bodies in a gravitational field seem a matter of course.

— Einstein, 1911

Soon after completing work on his theory of gravity (known as general relativity) and then also in later years, Einstein recalled the importance of the equivalence principle to his work:

The breakthrough came suddenly one day. I was sitting on a chair in my patent office in Bern. Suddenly a thought struck me: If a man falls freely, he would not feel his weight. I was taken aback. This simple thought experiment made a deep impression on me. This led me to the theory of gravity.

— Einstein, 1922

Einstein's development of general relativity necessitated some means of empirically discriminating the theory from other theories of gravity compatible with special relativity. Accordingly, Robert Dicke developed a test program incorporating two new principles – the § Einstein equivalence principle, and the § Strong equivalence principle – each of which assumes the weak equivalence principle as a starting point.

== Definitions ==
During the Apollo 15 mission in 1971, astronaut David Scott showed that Galileo was right: acceleration is the same for all bodies subject to gravity on the Moon, even for a hammer and a feather.

Three main forms of the equivalence principle are in current use: weak (Galilean), Einsteinian, and strong. Some proposals also suggest finer divisions or minor alterations.

=== Weak equivalence principle ===
The weak equivalence principle, also known as the universality of free fall or the Galilean equivalence principle assumes falling bodies are self-bound by non-gravitational forces only (e.g. a stone). Some ways to define it include:

- "All uncharged, freely falling test particles follow the same trajectories, once an initial position and velocity have been prescribed".
- "... in a uniform gravitational field all objects, regardless of their composition, fall with precisely the same acceleration." "The weak equivalence principle implicitly assumes that the falling objects are bound by non-gravitational forces."
- "... in a gravitational field the acceleration of a test particle is independent of its properties, including its rest mass."
- Mass (measured with a balance) and weight (measured with a scale) are locally in identical ratio for all bodies (the opening page to Newton's Philosophiæ Naturalis Principia Mathematica, 1687).
- "the trajectory of a freely falling 'test' body (one not acted upon by such forces as electromagnetism and too small to be affected by tidal gravitational forces) is independent of its internal structure and composition."

=== Einstein equivalence principle ===
What is now called the "Einstein equivalence principle" states that the weak equivalence principle holds, and that:

the outcome of any local, non-gravitational test experiment is independent of the experimental apparatus' velocity relative to the gravitational field and is independent of where and when in the gravitational field the experiment is performed.

Here local means that experimental setup must be small compared to variations in the gravitational field, called tidal forces. The test experiment must be small enough so that its gravitational potential does not alter the result.

The two additional constraints added to the weak principle to get the Einstein form

1. the independence of the outcome on relative velocity (local Lorentz invariance) and
2. independence of "where" (known as local positional invariance)

have far reaching consequences.

With these constraints alone Einstein was able to predict the gravitational redshift. Theories of gravity that obey the Einstein equivalence principle must be "metric theories", meaning that trajectories of freely falling bodies are geodesics of symmetric metric.

Around 1960 Leonard I. Schiff conjectured that any complete and consistent theory of gravity that embodies the weak equivalence principle implies the Einstein equivalence principle; the conjecture can't be proven but has several plausibility arguments in its favor. Nonetheless, the two principles are tested with very different kinds of experiments.

The Einstein equivalence principle has been criticized as imprecise, because there is no universally accepted way to distinguish gravitational from non-gravitational experiments (see for instance Hadley and Durand).

=== Strong equivalence principle ===
The strong equivalence principle applies the same constraints as the Einstein equivalence principle, but allows the freely falling bodies to be massive gravitating objects as well as test particles. The strong equivalence principle includes astronomic bodies with gravitational self-binding energy. Thus this is a version of the equivalence principle that applies to objects that exert a gravitational force on themselves, such as stars, planets, black holes or Cavendish experiments. It requires that the gravitational constant be the same everywhere in the universe. It is much more restrictive than the Einstein equivalence principle.

Like the Einstein equivalence principle, the strong equivalence principle requires gravity to be geometrical by nature, but in addition it forbids any extra fields, so the metric alone determines all of the effects of gravity. If an observer measures a patch of space to be flat, then the strong equivalence principle suggests that it is absolutely equivalent to any other patch of flat space elsewhere in the universe. Einstein's theory of general relativity (including the cosmological constant) is thought to be the only theory of gravity that satisfies the strong equivalence principle. A number of alternative theories, such as Brans–Dicke theory and the Einstein-aether theory add additional fields.

=== Active, passive, and inertial masses ===
Some of the tests of the equivalence principle use names for the different ways mass appears in physical formulae. In nonrelativistic physics three kinds of mass can be distinguished:

1. Inertial mass intrinsic to an object, the sum of all of its mass–energy.
2. Passive mass, the response to gravity, the object's weight.
3. Active mass, the mass that determines the object's gravitational effect.

By definition of active and passive gravitational mass, the force on $M_1$ due to the gravitational field of $M_0$ is:
$$F_1 = \frac{M_0^\mathrm{act} M_1^\mathrm{pass}}{r^2}$$
Likewise the force on a second object of arbitrary mass_{2} due to the gravitational field of mass_{0} is:
$$F_2 = \frac{M_0^\mathrm{act}  M_2^\mathrm{pass}}{r^2}$$

By definition of inertial mass:
$$F = m^\mathrm{inert} a$$
if $m_1$ and $m_2$ are the same distance $r$ from $m_0$ then, by the weak equivalence principle, they fall at the same rate (i.e. their accelerations are the same).
$$a_1 = \frac{F_1}{m_1^\mathrm{inert}} = a_2 = \frac{F_2}{m_2^\mathrm{inert}}$$

Hence:
$$\frac{M_0^\mathrm{act} M_1^\mathrm{pass}}{r^2 m_1^\mathrm{inert}} = \frac{M_0^\mathrm{act}  M_2^\mathrm{pass}}{r^2 m_2^\mathrm{inert}}$$

Therefore:
$$\frac{M_1^\mathrm{pass}}{m_1^\mathrm{inert}} = \frac{M_2^\mathrm{pass}}{m_2^\mathrm{inert}}$$

In other words, passive gravitational mass must be proportional to inertial mass for objects, independent of their material composition if the weak equivalence principle is obeyed.

The dimensionless Eötvös-parameter or Eötvös ratio $\eta(A,B)$ is the difference of the ratios of gravitational and inertial masses divided by their average for the two sets of test masses "A" and "B".
$$\eta(A,B)=2\frac{ \left(\frac{m_{\textrm pass}}{m_{\textrm inert}}\right)_A-\left(\frac{m_{\textrm pass}}{m_{\textrm inert}}\right)_B }{\left(\frac{m_{\textrm pass}}{m_{\textrm inert}}\right)_A+\left(\frac{m_{\textrm pass}}{m_{\textrm inert}}\right)_B}.$$
Values of this parameter are used to compare tests of the equivalence principle.

A similar parameter can be used to compare passive and active mass. By Newton's third law of motion:
$$F_1 = \frac{M_0^\mathrm{act} M_1^\mathrm{pass}}{r^2}$$
must be equal and opposite to
$$F_0 = \frac{M_1^\mathrm{act}  M_0^\mathrm{pass}}{r^2}$$

It follows that:
$$\frac{M_0^\mathrm{act}}{M_0^\mathrm{pass}} = \frac{M_1^\mathrm{act}}{M_1^\mathrm{pass}}$$

In words, passive gravitational mass must be proportional to active gravitational mass for all objects. The difference,
$$S_{0,1} = \frac{M_0^\mathrm{act}}{M_0^\mathrm{pass}} - \frac{M_1^\mathrm{act}}{M_1^\mathrm{pass}}$$
is used to quantify differences between passive and active mass.

== Experimental tests ==
=== Tests of the weak equivalence principle ===
Tests of the weak equivalence principle are those that verify the equivalence of gravitational mass and inertial mass. An obvious test is dropping different objects and verifying that they land at the same time. Historically this was the first approach – though probably not by Galileo's Leaning Tower of Pisa experiment but instead earlier by Simon Stevin, who dropped lead balls of different masses off the Delft churchtower and listened for the sound of them hitting a wooden plank.

Newton measured the period of pendulums made with different materials as an alternative test giving the first precision measurements. Loránd Eötvös's approach in 1908 used a very sensitive torsion balance to give precision approaching 1 in a billion. Modern experiments have improved this by another factor of a million.

A popular exposition of this measurement was done on the Moon by David Scott in 1971. He dropped a falcon feather and a hammer at the same time, showing on video that they landed at the same time.

Chronology of weak equivalence principles tests
Year	Investigator	Sensitivity	Method
500?	John Philoponus	"small"	Drop tower
1585	Simon Stevin	5×10^{−2}	Drop tower
1590?	Galileo Galilei	2×10^{−3}	Pendulum, drop tower
1686	Isaac Newton	10^{−3}	Pendulum
1832	Friedrich Wilhelm Bessel	2×10^{−5}	Pendulum
1908 (1922)	Loránd Eötvös	2×10^{−9}	Torsion balance
1910	Southerns	5×10^{−6}	Pendulum
1918	Zeeman	3×10^{−8}	Torsion balance
1923	Potter	3×10^{−6}	Pendulum
1935	Renner	2×10^{−9}	Torsion balance
1964	Roll, Krotkov, Dicke	3×10^{−11}	Torsion balance
1972	Braginsky, Panov	10^{−12}	Torsion balance
1976	Shapiro, et al.	10^{−12}	Lunar laser ranging
1979	Keiser, Faller	4×10^{−11}	Fluid support
1987	Niebauer, et al.	10^{−10}	Drop tower
1989	Stubbs, et al.	10^{−11}	Torsion balance
1990	Adelberger, Eric G.; et al.	10^{−12}	Torsion balance
1999	Baessler, et al.	5×10^{−14}	Torsion balance
2008	Schlamminger, et al.	10^{−13}	Torsion balance
2017	MICROSCOPE	10^{−15}	Earth orbit

Experiments are still being performed at the University of Washington which have placed limits on the differential acceleration of objects towards the Earth, the Sun and towards dark matter in the Galactic Center.

==== Proposed tests ====
Proposals for satellite experiments to test the weak equivalence principle in space to much higher accuracy include Satellite Test of the Equivalence Principle and GG (for Galileo Galilei).

With the first successful production of antimatter, in particular anti-hydrogen, a new approach to test the weak equivalence principle has been proposed. Experiments to compare the gravitational behavior of matter and antimatter are currently being developed.

Proposals that may lead to a quantum theory of gravity such as string theory and loop quantum gravity predict violations of the weak equivalence principle because they contain many light scalar fields with long Compton wavelengths, which should generate fifth forces and variation of the fundamental constants. Heuristic arguments suggest that the magnitude of these equivalence principle violations could be in the 10^{−13} to 10^{−18} range.

Currently envisioned tests of the weak equivalence principle are approaching a degree of sensitivity such that non-discovery of a violation would be just as profound a result as discovery of a violation. Non-discovery of equivalence principle violation in this range would suggest that gravity is so fundamentally different from other forces as to require a major reevaluation of current attempts to unify gravity with the other forces of nature. A positive detection, on the other hand, would provide a major guidepost towards unification.

=== Tests of the Einstein equivalence principle ===
In addition to the tests of the weak equivalence principle, the Einstein equivalence principle requires testing the local Lorentz invariance and local positional invariance conditions.

Testing local Lorentz invariance amounts to testing special relativity, a theory with a vast number of existing tests. Nevertheless, attempts to look for quantum gravity require even more precise tests. The modern tests include looking for directional variations in the speed of light (called "clock anisotropy tests") and new forms of the Michelson–Morley experiment. The anisotropy measures less than one part in 10^{−20}.

Testing local positional invariance divides into tests in space and in time. Space-based tests use measurements of the gravitational redshift, the classic is the Pound–Rebka experiment in the 1960s. The most precise measurement was done in 1976 by flying a hydrogen maser and comparing it to one on the ground. The Global Positioning System requires compensation for this redshift to give accurate position values.

Time-based tests search for variation of fundamental physical constants. For example, Webb et al. reported detection of variation (at the 10^{−5} level) of the fine-structure constant from measurements of distant quasars. Other researchers dispute these findings.

The present best limits on the variation of the fundamental constants have mainly been set by studying the naturally occurring Oklo natural nuclear fission reactor, where nuclear reactions similar to ones we observe today have been shown to have occurred underground approximately two billion years ago. These reactions are extremely sensitive to the values of the fundamental constants.

Tests of changes in fundamental constants
Constant	Year	Method	Limit on fractional change per year
weak interaction constant	1976	Oklo	10^{−11}
fine-structure constant	1976	Oklo	10^{−16}
electron–proton mass ratio	2002	quasars	10^{−15}

=== Tests of the strong equivalence principle ===
The strong equivalence principle can be tested by 1) finding orbital variations in massive bodies (Sun-Earth-Moon), 2) variations in the gravitational constant (G) depending on nearby sources of gravity or on motion, or 3) searching for a variation of Newton's gravitational constant over the life of the universe

Orbital variations due to gravitational self-energy should cause a "polarization" of solar system orbits called the Nordtvedt effect. This effect has been sensitively tested by Lunar Laser Ranging experiments. Up to the limit of one part in 10^{13} there is no Nordtvedt effect.

A tight bound on the effect of nearby gravitational fields on the strong equivalence principle comes from modeling the orbits of binary stars and comparing the results to pulsar timing data. In 2014, astronomers discovered a stellar triple system containing a millisecond pulsar PSR J0337+1715 and two white dwarfs orbiting it. The system provided them a chance to test the strong equivalence principle in a strong gravitational field with high accuracy. If there is any departure from the strong equivalence principle, it is no more than two parts per million.

Most alternative theories of gravity predict a change in the gravity constant over time. Studies of Big Bang nucleosynthesis, analysis of pulsars, and the lunar laser ranging data have shown that G cannot have varied by more than 10% since the creation of the universe. The best data comes from studies of the ephemeris of Mars, based on three successive NASA missions, Mars Global Surveyor, Mars Odyssey, and Mars Reconnaissance Orbiter.

== Charged bodies ==
Precisely phrased definitions of the equivalence principle exclude test bodies with electric charge. A charged and uncharged ball dropped in a gravitational field results in a paradox. To an observer standing where the balls will land, the accelerating charged ball will lose kinetic energy by emitting radiation and will hence reach the floor after the uncharged ball. To an observer falling with the balls, the radiation starts when the charged ball lands on the ground.

This does not point to any defect in the equivalence principle itself, only to oversimplified statements of the principle. A charged particle together with its associated electromagnetic field cannot in general be treated as confined to an arbitrarily small neighborhood, since the field extends beyond the local region in which the equivalence principle applies. As the charged and neutral balls are released side by side, the balls will initially accelerate identically. But after a short period of time, the charged ball will experience a back reaction from its own electromagnetic fields. Quantitative treatment of electromagnetic self-force in curved spacetime is technically difficult.

== See also ==
- Eötvös experiment
- Einstein's thought experiments
- Gauge gravitation theory
- General covariance
- Mach's principle
- Tests of general relativity
- Unsolved problems in astronomy
- Unsolved problems in physics
