= James W. Brault =

Scientist

James W. Brault (February 10, 1932 – November 1, 2008) was a 20th-century scientist and a pioneer of Fourier transform spectroscopy. He was a world-leading expert in physical instrument design, numerical methods as applied to spectroscopy, and in atomic and molecular spectroscopy.

He graduated from Princeton University in 1962 as a student of Robert H. Dicke on the gravitational redshift of the sun and worked later at the Kitt Peak National Observatory, where he installed a high-resolution Fourier transform spectrometer used for astronomy, solar physics, and laboratory spectroscopy. In his early years, Brault was involved in the development of the lock-in amplifier, and of differential interference microscopy and phase modulation microscopy with Robert D. Allen.
