= Lamb–Mössbauer factor =

Ratio of elastic to incoherent absorption in nuclear physics

In physics, the Lamb–Mössbauer factor (LMF, named after Willis Lamb and Rudolf Mössbauer) or elastic incoherent structure factor (EISF) is the ratio of elastic to total incoherent neutron scattering, or the ratio of recoil-free to total nuclear resonant absorption in Mössbauer spectroscopy. The corresponding factor for coherent neutron or X-ray scattering is the Debye–Waller factor; often, that term is used in a more generic way to include the incoherent case as well.

When first reporting on recoil-free resonance absorption, Mössbauer (1959) cited relevant theoretical work by Lamb (1939). The first use of the term "Mössbauer–Lamb factor" seems to be by Tzara (1961); from 1962 on, the form "Lamb–Mössbauer factor" came into widespread use.

Singwi and Sjölander (1960) pointed out the close relation to incoherent neutron scattering. With the invention of backscattering spectrometers, it became possible to measure the Lamb–Mössbauer factor as a function of the wavenumber (whereas Mössbauer spectroscopy operates at a fixed wavenumber). Subsequently, the term elastic incoherent structure factor became more frequent.
