= Glen Rebka =

American physicist (1931–2015)

Glen Anderson Rebka Jr.
- Born: September 19, 1931; Cincinnati, Ohio, U.S.
- Died: January 13, 2015 (aged 83); Laramie, Wyoming, U.S.
- Education: Harvard University (Ph.D., 1961)
- Known for: Pound–Rebka experiment
- Scientific career
- Fields: Physics
- Workplaces: Harvard University; Yale University; University of Wyoming; Los Alamos National Laboratory

Glen Anderson Rebka Jr. (September 19, 1931, Cincinnati – January 13, 2015, Laramie) was an American physicist.

== Biography ==
Rebka attained a doctorate 1961 at Harvard, where he began study in 1953. Starting from 1961 he was at Yale University and starting from 1970 at the University of Wyoming, where he was from 1983 to 1991 department head of the physics faculty and became in 1997 professor emeritus. In addition to his academic career he did much work as an experimental elementary-particle physicist at Los Alamos National Laboratory. At the University of Wyoming he built up the astrophysics faculty.

In 1960 Robert Pound carried out together with his assistant Glen Rebka an experiment, the Pound–Rebka experiment, using the Mössbauer effect to measure the gravitational redshift of the radiation from a gamma source in the gravitation field of planet Earth. Pound and Rebka used at Harvard University the Jefferson tower, which is only 22.6 meters tall. The work was part of Rebka's thesis with Pound as thesis advisor.

Pound and Rebka received in 1965 the Eddington medal of the Royal Astronomical Society.
