= Robert Pound =

Canadian-American physicist (1919 – 2010)

- Born: May 16, 1919; Ridgeway, Ontario, Canada
- Died: April 12, 2010 (aged 90); Belmont, Massachusetts
- Education: University at Buffalo (BA)
- Known for: Nuclear magnetic resonance (NMR); Pound–Drever–Hall technique Pound-Rebka experiment
- Scientific career
- Fields: Physics
- Workplaces: Harvard University
- Doctoral students: Glen Rebka; Neil S. Sullivan; Michio Kaku

Robert Vivian Pound (May 16, 1919 – April 12, 2010) was a Canadian-American physicist who helped discover nuclear magnetic resonance (NMR) and who devised the famous Pound–Rebka experiment supporting general relativity. He became a tenured professor of physics at Harvard without ever having received a graduate degree.

Pound was born in Ridgeway, Ontario.

In 1946 Pound and collaborators Edward Purcell and Henry Torrey adapted the Rad Lab techniques—widely used to this day in radar and communications—to detect nuclear magnetic resonance in condensed matter. Soon NMR became a standard analytical tool in chemistry, biology, and physics, and the "Pound box" marginal oscillator became the standard NMR detector.

The discovery of NMR won the Nobel Prize in Physics in 1952, though, due to the limitation on the number of recipients and the simultaneous achievements of Felix Bloch's group, only two recipients were designated. In his address to recipient Ed Purcell, Professor Hulthén nevertheless celebrated the "very interesting experiment you performed together with Dr. Pound", making Pound one of only two collaborators explicitly named in the speech. Pound received the National Medal of Science in 1990 for his lifetime contributions to the field of physics. Pound was the Mallinckrodt Professor of Physics emeritus at Harvard University. He was a member of the class of 1941 at the University at Buffalo.

Pound's name is also attached to the Pound–Drever–Hall technique used to lock the frequency of a laser on a stable optical cavity.
