= Richtmyer Memorial Award =

The Richtmyer Memorial Award is an award for physics education, named for physicist Floyd K. Richtmyer and given annually by the American Association of Physics Teachers. Its recipients include over 15 Nobel Prize winners.

== Establishment and award criteria ==
Floyd T. Richtmyer (1881–1939) was one of the first presidents of the American Association of Physics Teachers and his work helped shape the development of physics in the United States. The Richtmyer Award was established in 1941, and is typically given to educators who have made outstanding contributions as teachers in their fields. It is awarded to those who have not only produced important current research in physics, but to those who have, by means of communication to both students and other educators, imparted information and motivation to participants in the field. The effective use of a teaching method in order to pass on information, and to stimulate interest in physics, is seen as being worthy of recognition in its own right, in addition to the importance of the production of new research.

Recipients of the award deliver a Keynote Address, the annual Richtmyer Lecture, which is designed for communication with non-specialist audiences, during the AAPT Winter Meeting.

== Recipients ==
Past recipients of the award include "a long list of giants in the field of physics" such as UC Berkeley Chancellor Robert J. Birgeneau (1989); Steven Chu of the Lawrence Berkeley National Laboratory (1990), who also is a UC Berkeley professor of physics and a physics Nobelist, and who has been the 12th United States Secretary of Energy since 2009; and physicists Charles Townes (1959), Emilio Segrè (1957), J. Robert Oppenheimer (1947), and Nobel prize winner Carl Wieman of the University of Colorado at Boulder in 1996.

Since its foundation in 1941, the following scientists from a wide number of institutions have received this award:

Source: American Association of Physics Teachers

- 1941 - Arthur H. Compton, University of Chicago
- 1942 - Gordon Ferrie Hull, Dartmouth College
- 1944 - Karl K. Darrow, Columbia University
- 1945 - I.I. Rabi, Columbia University
- 1946 - Paul E. Klopsteg, Northwestern University
- 1947 - J.R. Oppenheimer, University of California
- 1948 - Homer L. Dodge, Norwich University
- 1949 - Lee A. DuBridge, California Institute of Technology
- 1950 - John H. Van Vleck, Harvard University
- 1951 - John C. Slater, Massachusetts Institute of Technology
- 1952 - Enrico Fermi, University of Chicago
- 1953 - Edward M. Purcell, Harvard University
- 1954 - John A. Wheeler, Princeton University
- 1955 - Eugene P. Wigner, Princeton University
- 1956 - Walter H. Brattain, Bell Telephone Laboratories
- 1957 - Emilio Segre, University of California
- 1958 - Philip Morrison, Cornell University
- 1959 - Charles H. Townes, Columbia University
- 1960 - James A. Van Allen, State University of Iowa
- 1961 - William A. Fowler, California Institute of Technology
- 1962 - Thomas Gold, Cornell University
- 1963 - Wolfgang K.H. Panofsky, Stanford University
- 1964 - Fred Hoyle, Cambridge University
- 1965 - William M. Fairbank, Stanford University
- 1966 - Murray Gell-Mann, California Institute of Technology
- 1967 - Robert H. Dicke, Princeton University
- 1968 - Robert R. Wilson, National Accelerator Laboratory
- 1969 - S. Chandrasekhar, University of Chicago
- 1970 - Arthur L. Schawlow, Stanford University
- 1971 - Edwin Land, Polaroid Corporation
- 1972 - Robert B. Leighton, California Institute of Technology
- 1973 - Michael E. Fisher, Cornell University
- 1974 - Steven Weinberg, Harvard University
- 1975 - Riccardo Giacconi, Harvard University
- 1976 - Britton Chance, University of Pennsylvania School of Medicine
- 1977 - Michael Tinkham, Harvard University
- 1978 - Sidney Drell, Stanford Linear Accelerator Center
- 1979 - William A. Nierenberg, Scripps Institute of Oceanography
- 1980 - Edward C. Stone, California Institute of Technology
- 1981 - Hans Frauenfelder, University of Illinois
- 1982 - Karen McNally, Seismological Laboratory, California Institute of Technology and University of California, Santa Cruz
- 1983 - Edward A. Frieman, Science Applications Inc., La Jolla, California
- 1984 - David N. Schramm, University of Chicago
- 1985 - Gerry Neugebauer, California Institute of Technology
- 1986 - Leon M. Lederman, Fermi National Accelerator Laboratory
- 1987 - Clifford M. Will, Washington University in St. Louis
- 1988 - Peter A. Franken, University of Arizona
- 1989 - Robert J. Birgeneau, Massachusetts Institute of Technology
- 1990 - Steven Chu, Stanford University
- 1991 - Larry W. Esposito, University of Colorado Boulder
- 1992 - Kip S. Thorne, California Institute of Technology, Pasadena
- 1993 - Richard E. Smalley, Rice University
- 1994 - Sheldon Glashow, Harvard University
- 1995 - Joseph Henry Taylor, Princeton University
- 1996 - Carl E. Wieman, University of Colorado
- 1997 - H. Eugene Stanley, Boston University
- 1998 - Douglas D. Osheroff, Stanford University
- 1999 - Wayne H. Knox, Bell Laboratories
- 2000 - William D. Phillips, National Institute of Standards and Technology
- 2001 - Shirley Ann Jackson, Rensselaer Polytechnic Institute, Troy, NY
- 2002 - Jordan A. Goodman, University of Maryland, College Park, MD
- 2003 - Margaret Murnane, University of Colorado, Boulder, CO
- 2004 - Lene Vestergaard Hau, Harvard University, Cambridge, MA
- 2005 - Carlos Bustamante, University of California, Berkeley CA
- 2006 - Neil Ashby, University of Colorado, Boulder, CO
- 2007 - Alex Filippenko, University of California, Berkeley CA
- 2008/9 - Vera Rubin, Carnegie Institution of Washington
- 2010 - not Awarded
- 2011 - Kathryn Moler, Geballe Laboratory for Advanced Materials and Physics, Stanford University, CA
- 2012 - Brian Greene, Columbia University, New York, NY
- 2014 - Sir Michael Berry, University of Bristol
- 2016 - Derek Muller, Veritasium YouTube Channel, Catalyst
- 2017 - Jay M. Pasachoff, Williams College, Williamstown, MA
- 2018 - Mark Beck, Whitman College, Walla Walla, Washington
- 2023 - Jocelyn Bell Burnell, University of Oxford, Oxford, England
- 2024 - Katie Mack, Perimeter Institute, Waterloo, Ontario, Canada
- 2025 - Nadya Mason, University of Chicago Pritzker School of Molecular Engineering, Chicago, IL
- 2026 - Rhett Allain, Southern Louisiana University, Hammond, LA

== Significance ==
It is the emphasis on mentoring younger teachers that has made the Richtmyer Award distinct from other teaching awards that centre mainly upon the education of students. The Richtmyer Award is the forerunner of modern awards such as the Young Faculty Award (YFA) program established by DARPA, the aim of which is to identify and engage rising research stars in junior faculty positions at U.S. academic institutions.

== See also ==
- List of physics awards
