= Gravitomagnetic time delay =

Relativistic effect

According to general relativity, a massive spinning body endowed with angular momentum S will alter the space-time fabric around it in such a way that several effects on moving test particles and propagating electromagnetic waves occur.

In particular, the direction of motion with respect to the sense of rotation of the central body is relevant because co-and counter-propagating waves carry a "gravitomagnetic" time delay Δt_{GM} which could be, in principle, be measured if S is known.

On the contrary, if the validity of general relativity is assumed, it is possible to use Δt_{GM} to measure S. Such effect must not be confused with the much larger Shapiro time delay Δt_{GE} induced by the "gravitoelectric" Schwarzschild-like component of the gravitational field of a planet of mass M considered non-rotating. Unlike the small Δt_{GM}, the Shapiro time delay has been accurately measured in several radar-ranging experiments with Solar System interplanetary spacecraft.

== See also ==
- Introduction to general relativity
- Gravitomagnetic clock effect
