= Gravitomagnetic clock effect =

Deviation from Kepler's third law

In physics, the gravitomagnetic clock effect is a deviation from Kepler's third law that, according to the weak-field and low-velocity approximation of general relativity, will be suffered by a particle in orbit around a (slowly) spinning body, such as a typical planet or star.

== Explanation ==
According to general relativity, in its weak-field and low-velocity linearized approximation, a slowly spinning body induces an additional component of the gravitational field that acts on a freely-falling test particle with a non-central, gravitomagnetic Lorentz-like force.

Among its consequences on the particle's orbital motion there is a small correction to Kepler's third law, namely

$$T_{\rm Kep}=2\pi\sqrt{\frac{a^3}{GM}}$$

where T_{Kep} is the particle's period, M is the mass of the central body, and a is the semimajor axis of the particle's ellipse. If the orbit of the particle is circular and lies in the equatorial plane of the central body, the correction is

$T=T_{\rm Kep}+T_{\rm Gvm}=T_{\rm Kep}\pm\frac{S}{Mc^2},$ where S is the central body's angular momentum and c is the speed of light in vacuum.

Particles orbiting in opposite directions experience gravitomagnetic corrections T_{Gvm} with opposite signs, so that the difference of their orbital periods would cancel the standard Keplerian terms and would add the gravitomagnetic ones.

Note that the + sign occurs for particle's corotation with respect to the rotation of the central body, whereas the − sign is for counter-rotation. That is, if the satellite orbits in the same direction as the planet spins, it takes more time to make a full orbit, whereas if it moves oppositely with respect to the planet's rotation its orbital period gets shorter.

== See also ==
- Introduction to general relativity
- Gravitomagnetic time delay
