= Karen McNally =

American seismologist (1940–2014)

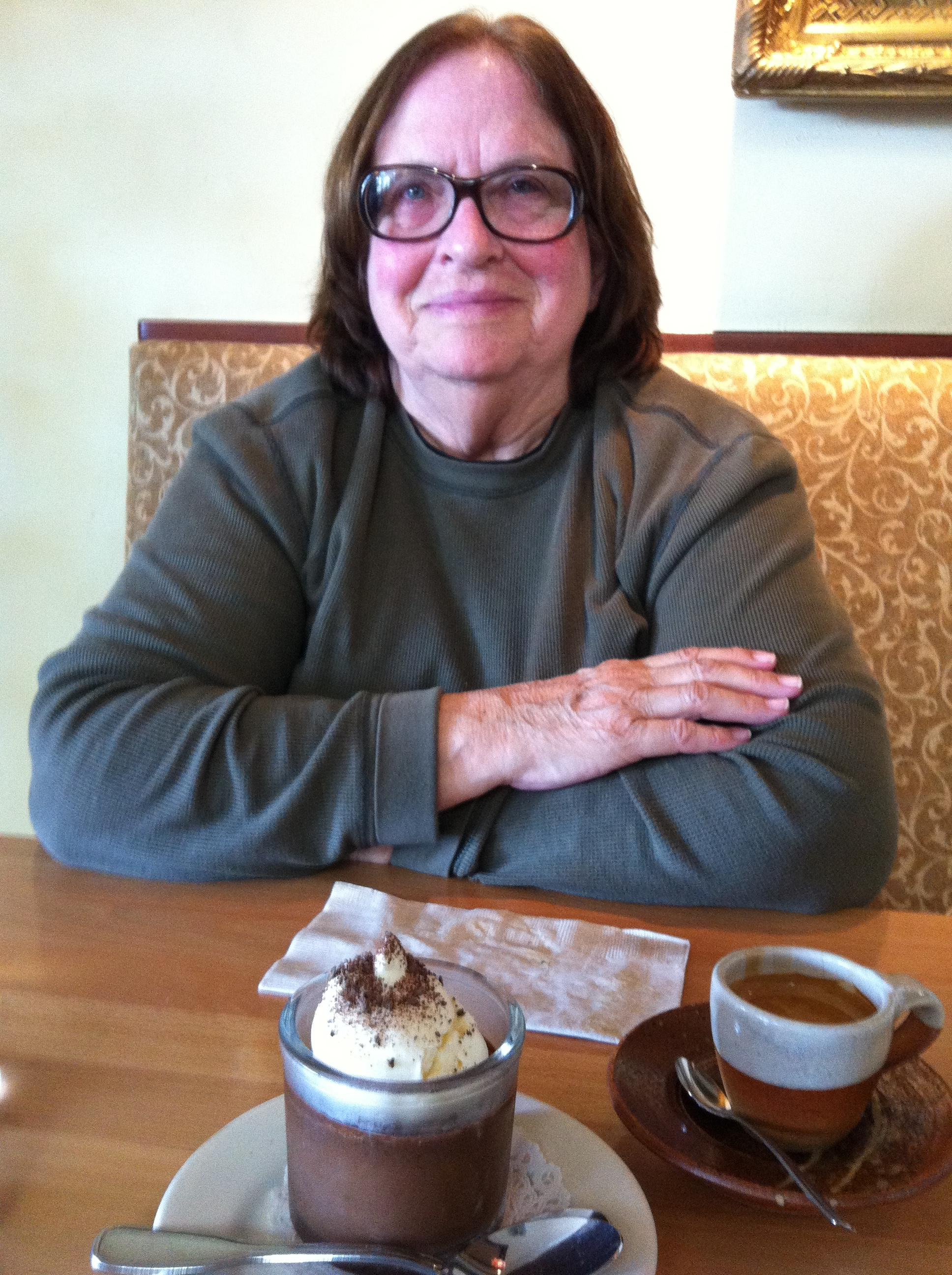
- Born: 1940; Clovis, California
- Died: December 20, 2014 (aged 73–74); Davenport, California
- Education: University of California, Berkeley
- Known for: The establishment of the Seismology Laboratory and the Institute of Tectonics at UCSC; The establishment of the geophysical observatory at the National University of Costa Rica
- Awards: Richtmyer Memorial Award from the American Association of Physics Teachers, 1982; University Medal (the Medalla Universidad Nacional) by the National University of Costa Rica for her contributions, July, 2004.
- Scientific career
- Fields: Seismology
- Workplaces: California Institute of Technology, UC Santa Cruz
- Doctoral students: Marino Protti with Susan Schwartz as co advisor, and more

Karen Cook McNally (1940 – December 20, 2014) was an American seismologist and earthquake risk expert.

== Professional life ==
=== Institutions ===
In 1971, she earned her bachelor's degree and in 1973 she received her master's degrees. Three years later she obtained her PhD (1976) in geophysics from the University of California, Berkeley. McNally worked at the California Institute of Technology with Charles Francis Richter, creator of the Richter scale, and became part of the faculty at the University of California, Santa Cruz in 1981, as an Earth and planetary sciences professor. She was director of the "Richter Seismological Laboratory" there and their instruments were able to capture high-quality recordings of the 1989 Loma Prieta earthquake. She founded the "Institute of Tectonics" and helped establish a seismology research program at the university.

== Seismic gaps as an earthquake precursor ==
One of her areas of interest was the study of seismic gaps as precursors of disaster-prone area of an impending earthquake. One of these seismic gaps at the time was the area south of Oaxaca along the western coast of Mexico. After geophysicists from Texas and Japan had warned that the area is mature for a big earthquake, McNally and her group from the National University of Mexico deployed there several mobile seismometers. That array was ready on November 1, 1978. Over the next few weeks, abundance of micro and small earthquakes were recorded, and on November 29 early evening, a 7.8 magnitude earthquake hit the area where the epicenter was in a distance of 50 kilometers from the mobile seismometer's array. These seismometers recorded a well understood picture of that seismic event and its foreshoks and aftershocks. about 3 years later, McNally and her group summarized their conclusions from that event in a scientific article.

A year later, she tried to analyze the data from that earthquake and from others that occurred during the 1960s and published a report concerning the implementation of these data for earthquakes prediction, including 86 relevant references that published since 1978 earthquake.

Within 2 more years, she summarized her conclusions for earthquakes prediction in Southern California in a final technical report with Karen Ward from the U.S.G.S. as her Government Technical Officer. Her work in predicting and helping prepare Mexico for the 1985 Michoacán earthquake, also earned her a spotlight in Time Magazine.

=== Seismic risk in Costa Rica ===
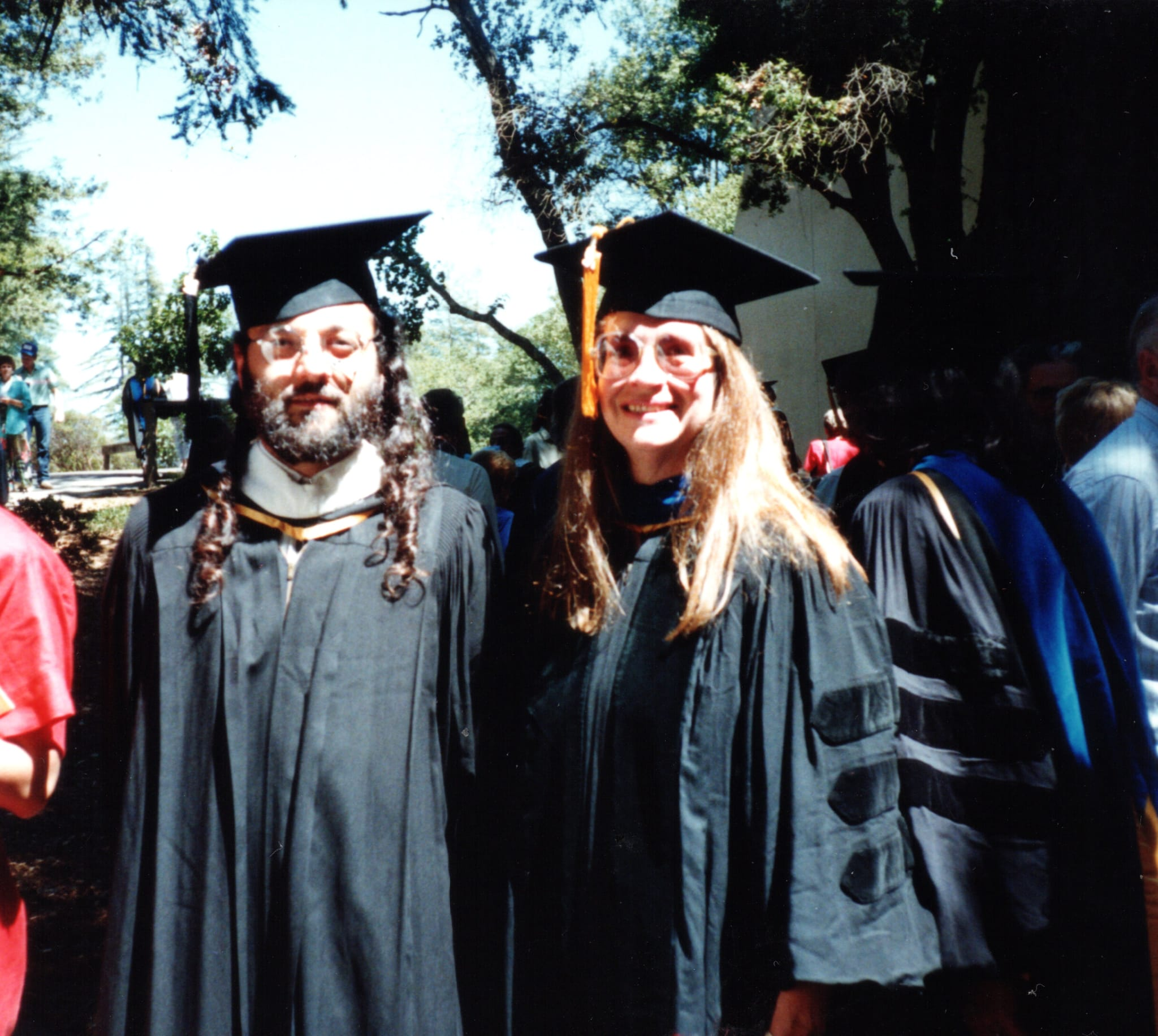
McNally with student and later colleague: Marino Protti, from the National University of Costa Rica.

In 1984, McNally joined a modern geophysical observatory (the Observatorio Vulcanológico y Sismológico de Costa Rica, Universidad Nacional (OVSICORI-UNA)) and helped to establish a national seismographic network in Costa Rica, and with this she was able to improve the country's program for reducing earthquake hazards. With funding from Office of Foreign Disaster Assistance of the U.S Agency for International Development, McNally was able to lead a team of U.C. Santa Cruz and Costa Rician scientists to set up the seismographic network. She was awarded the University Medal, more specifically named the "Medalla Universidad Nacional" by the National University of Costa Rica for her contributions on July 2, 2004. Her work in Costa Rica also encouraged ongoing collaborations between the U.C. Santa Cruz with faculties and researchers in Costa Rica.

She was a member of the board of directors for the Seismological Society of America and the Incorporated Research Institutions for Seismology and sat on the California Earthquake Prediction Evaluation Council. In 1982, she received the Richtmyer Memorial Award from the American Association of Physics Teachers.

== Personal life ==
McNally was born in Clovis, California on January 26, 1940. She married at a young age and had two daughters, Kim and Meredith. The couple divorced in 1966. She also had two siblings, a brother, Jerry and a sister, Jean.

She died at home in Davenport at the age of 74.
