= Primary Atomic Reference Clock in Space =

The Primary Atomic Reference Clock in Space or PARCS was an atomic-clock mission scheduled to fly on the International Space Station (ISS) in 2008, but cancelled to make way for the Vision for Space Exploration. The mission, to have been funded by NASA, involved a laser-cooled caesium atomic clock, and a time-transfer system using Global Positioning System (GPS) satellites. PARCS was to fly concurrently with the Superconducting Microwave Oscillator (SUMO) a different type of clock that was to be compared against the PARCS clock to test certain theories. The objectives of the mission were to have been:

- Test gravitational theory
- Study laser-cooled atoms in microgravity
- Improve the accuracy of timekeeping on earth

== Experiment location ==
The proposed ISS location for the experiment was on the External Facility of the Japanese Experimental Module (JEM). This location afforded good views of the GPS constellation of satellites, needed for comparing space and ground clocks. In addition, the volume, available power, and coolant system were well matched to the mission requirements.

== Goals ==
The microgravity environment of space allows slowing of atoms to speeds well below those used in terrestrial atomic clocks, providing for substantial improvement in clock accuracy. This very accurate space clock will be compared continuously to the SUMO oscillator, and these two clocks (being fundamentally different) will provide a test of "local position invariance." Comparisons between the space and earth clocks will yield a related, but important measurement of the gravitational frequency shift. Finally, the signals conveyed to the ground through the GPS time-transfer system will serve as a truly international time standard available to anyone on earth.

== Institutions and people ==
PARCS is a cooperative effort between the following organizations:

- Jet Propulsion Laboratory (JPL), which contributed Flight Hardware Development
- National Institute of Standards and Technology (NIST), which contributed Concept/Development Testing
- University of Colorado, which contributed Gravitational Testing

== Staff ==
Bill Klipstein of JPL was the Project Scientist, and Dave Seidel of JPL was the Project Manager. The Co-Principal Investigators were Don Sullivan and Bill Phillips of NIST, and Neil Ashby of the University of Colorado. John Lipa of Stanford University was the Principal Investigator for SUMO and John Dick of JPL was the Project Scientist for that program.
