= Neil Ashby =

American physicist

Neil Ashby (born March 5, 1934, in Dalhart, Texas) is an American physicist. He attended Dalhart High School, graduating in 1951. He received his B.A. degree (summa cum laude) in physics from the University of Colorado, Boulder, in 1955, and the M.S. and Ph.D. degrees from Harvard University, Cambridge, Massachusetts in 1956 and 1961, respectively. After spending a year in Europe as a postdoctoral fellow, he joined the faculty of the department of physics at the University of Colorado in 1962. He has been a professor of physics there since 1970, and was department chair from 1984 to 1988. He is currently professor emeritus – theoretical math-physics at the University of Colorado.

He consults for the Time and Frequency Division of the National Institute of Standards and Technology, working on relativistic effects on clocks and global time synchronization. His work was the basis of general relativistic correction being properly included in the Global Positioning System. He was a member of the International Committee on General Relativity and Gravitation from 1989 to 1995. He serves on several international working groups on relativistic effects in geodesy and in metrology. His work has influenced areas as diverse as:

- Introduction to general relativity
- General relativity
- Time dilation
- Earth-centered inertial co-ordinates
- Primary Atomic Reference Clock in Space
- Sagnac effect
- Einstein synchronisation

== Selected publications ==
- "Canonical Planetary Perturbation Equations for Velocity-Dependent Forces, and the Lense-Thirring Precession," N. Ashby, T. Allison,
- "Relativistic Gravity Theory And Related Tests With A Mercury Orbiter Mission" N. Ashby, P.L. Bender, I. Ciufolini, L. Iess, Proceedings of the Symposium on Future Fundamental Physics Missions in Space and Enabling Technologies, 5–7 April 1994, El Escorial, Spain (Eds. J. Leon And J. Perez-Mercader, Instituto Nacional de Tecnica Aeroespacial, Madrid.)
- "Relativity in the Future of Engineering," N. Ashby, IEEE Transactions on Instrumentation and Measurement 43, 505-514 (1994).
- "Introduction to Relativistic Effects in the Global Positioning System," N. Ashby, J.J. Spilker, Jr., Ch. 18 in The Global Positioning System—Theory and Application, Eds B.W. Parkinson, J.J. Spilker, Jr., American Institute of Aeronautics and Astronautics, (1995).
